= Equestrian at the 1924 Summer Olympics – Individual jumping =

Equestrian at the Olympics

Individual jumping at the Games of the VIII Olympiad
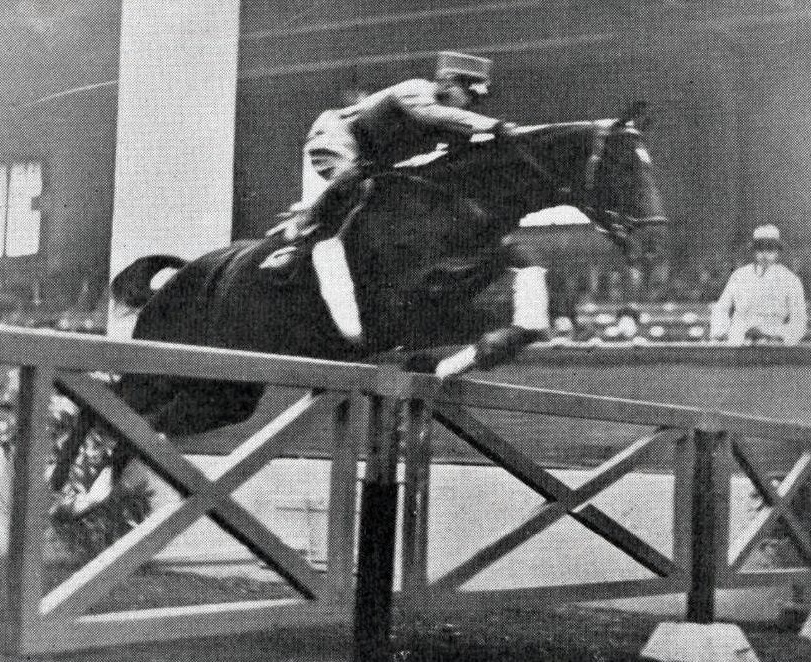
- Alphonse Gemuseus (1927)
- Venue: Stade Olympique Yves-du-Manoir
- Date: 27 July
- Competitors: 43 from 11 nations
- Winning score: 6.00

Medalists
| 1st place, gold medalist(s) | | Alphonse Gemuseus; Switzerland |
| 2nd place, silver medalist(s) | | Tommaso Lequio di Assaba; Italy |
| 3rd place, bronze medalist(s) | | Adam Królikiewicz; Poland |

The individual show jumping was one of five equestrianism events on the Equestrian at the 1924 Summer Olympics programme. The competition was held on Saturday 27 July 1924. 43 riders from 11 nations competed. Nations were limited to four riders each; the team jumping event used the same results as this competition, with the top three individual scores counting for each national team. The individual event was won by Alphonse Gemuseus of Switzerland, with the nation winning its first victory in its debut in the individual jumping event. Tommaso Lequio di Assaba of Italy became the first person to win multiple medals in the event, taking silver to add to his 1920 gold. Adam Królikiewicz earned Poland's first individual jumping medal with his bronze.

== Background ==
This was the fourth appearance of the event, which had first been held at the 1900 Summer Olympics and has been held at every Summer Olympics at which equestrian sports have been featured (that is, excluding 1896, 1904, and 1908). It is the oldest event on the current programme, the only one that was held in 1900.

Three riders from the 1920 competition returned: gold medalist Tommaso Lequio di Assaba of Italy, fourteenth-place finisher Åge Lundström of Sweden, and twenty-fifth-place finisher Jacques Misonne of Belgium.

Czechoslovakia, Poland, Portugal, Spain, and Switzerland each made their debut in the event. Belgium and France both competed for the fourth time, the only nations to have competed at each appearance of the event to that point.

== Competition format ==
The 1060 metre course consisted of 15 obstacles, which were up to 1.4 meters high. The water was a maximum of 4 meters in width. The pair with the fewest faults was the winner. The time limit for the course was 2:39 (400 metres per minute), with a penalty of 0.25 faults for every second or fraction thereof above the limit.

The faults possible were: 3 points for a first refusal, 6 for a second, elimination for a third; 5 points for a horse falling; 10 points for the rider being unseated; 4 points for knocking an obstacle down with the horse's fore legs, 2 point for knocking it down with the hind legs; and 2 points for going off-course.

== Schedule ==
| Date | Time | Round |
|---|---|---|
| Sunday, 27 July 1924 | | Final |

== Results ==
The course turned out to be rather difficult; the best pair finished with 6 faults.

| Rank | Rider | Nation | Faults | Time |
|---|---|---|---|---|
| 1st place, gold medalist(s) | Alphonse Gemuseus | Switzerland | 6.00 | 2:24.4 |
| 2nd place, silver medalist(s) | Tommaso Lequio di Assaba | Italy | 8.75 | 2:42.0 |
| 3rd place, bronze medalist(s) | Adam Królikiewicz | Poland | 10.00 | 2:38.4 |
| 4 | Philip Bowden-Smith | Great Britain | 10.50 | 2:41.4 |
| 5 | Aníbal de Almeida | Portugal | 12.00 | 2:28.8 |
| 6 | Åke Thelning | Sweden | 12.00 | 2:30.4 |
| 7 | Axel Ståhle | Sweden | 12.25 | 2:40.0 |
| 8 | Nicolas LeRoy | Belgium | 14.75 | 2:42.2 |
| 9 | José Álvarez | Spain | 18.00 | 2:31.0 |
| 10 | Karol von Rómmel | Poland | 18.00 | 2:38.2 |
| 11 | Åge Lundström | Sweden | 18.00 | 2:38.4 |
| 12 | Hélder Martins | Portugal | 19.00 | 2:31.4 |
| 13 | Jacques Misonne | Belgium | 19.50 | 3:05.4 |
| 14 | Werner Stuber | Switzerland | 20.00 | 2:32.4 |
| 15 | Leone Valle | Italy | 20.00 | 2:36.6 |
| 16 | Nemesio Martínez | Spain | 22.00 | 2:17.2 |
| 17 | José de Albuquerque | Portugal | 22.00 | 2:21.0 |
| 18 | Gaston Mesmaekers | Belgium | 22.75 | 2:50.0 |
| 19 | Georg von Braun | Sweden | 23.50 | 2:45.6 |
| 20 | Hans Bühler | Switzerland | 24.00 | 2:20.0 |
| 21 | Hans von der Weid | Switzerland | 24.00 | 2:39.8 |
| 22 | Jean Breuls van Tiecken | Belgium | 24.00 | 2:44.4 |
| 23 | Rudolf Popler | Czechoslovakia | 24.50 | 2:45.8 |
| 24 | Capel Brunker | Great Britain | 25.50 | 2:45.0 |
| 25 | John Barry | United States | 27.25 | 2:40.0 |
| 26 | Alessandro Alvisi | Italy | 28.75 | 2:42.4 |
| 27 | Geoffrey Brooke | Great Britain | 29.75 | 3:02.6 |
| 28 | Zdzisław Dziadulski | Poland | 30.50 | 2:49.4 |
| 29 | Sloan Doak | United States | 32.00 | 2:23.0 |
| 30 | José Navarro | Spain | 33.75 | 3:02.4 |
| 31 | Luís de Meneses | Portugal | 36.00 | 2:17.2 |
| 32 | Kazimierz Szosland | Poland | 39.25 | 3:20.0 |
| 33 | Pierre Clavé | France | 41.00 | 3:23.0 |
| 34 | Oldřich Buchar | Czechoslovakia | 45.00 | 2:37.6 |
| — | Emanuele Beraudo Di Pralormo | Italy | — | DNF |
| — | Michel Bignon | France | — | DNF |
| — | Frederic Bontecou | United States | — | DNF |
| — | Théophile Carbon | France | — | DNF |
| — | Henri de Royer-Dupré | France | — | DNF |
| — | Keith Hervey | Great Britain | — | DNF |
| — | Emilio López | Spain | — | DNF |
| — | Vernon Padgett | United States | — | DNF |
| — | Josef Rabas | Czechoslovakia | — | DNF |
