= Equestrian at the 1928 Summer Olympics – Team jumping =

Team jumping at the Games of the IX Olympiad
- Venue: Olympic Stadium
- Competitors: 45 from 15 nations

Medalists
1st place, gold medalist(s)		José Navarro Morenés and Zapatazo, José Álvarez de Bohórquez and Zalamero, Julio García Hernández de los Ríos and Revistade	Spain
2nd place, silver medalist(s)		Kazimierz Gzowski and Mylord, Kazimierz Szosland and Ali, Michał Antoniewicz and Readgleadt	Poland
3rd place, bronze medalist(s)		Karl Hansén and Gerold, Carl Björnstjerna and Kornett, Ernst Hallberg and Loke	Sweden

The team jumping at the 1928 Summer Olympics took place at Amsterdam. Scores from the individual competition were summed to give results in the team competition.

== Results ==
Source: Official results; De Wael

Rank	Nation	Rider	Horse	Faults	Total
1st place, gold medalist(s)	Spain	José Navarro	Zapatazo	0	4
1st place, gold medalist(s)	Spain	José Álvarez	Zalamero	2	4
1st place, gold medalist(s)	Spain	Julio García	Revistade	2	4
2nd place, silver medalist(s)	Poland	Kazimierz Gzowski	Mylord	0	8
2nd place, silver medalist(s)	Poland	Kazimierz Szosland	Alli	2	8
2nd place, silver medalist(s)	Poland	Michał Antoniewicz	Readglet	6	8
3rd place, bronze medalist(s)	Sweden	Karl Hansen	Gerold	0	10
3rd place, bronze medalist(s)	Sweden	Carl Björnstjerna	Kornett	2	10
3rd place, bronze medalist(s)	Sweden	Ernst Hallberg	Loke	8	10
4	Italy	Francesco Forquet	Capinera	0	12
4	Italy	Alessandro Bettoni-Cazzago	Aladino	6	12
4	Italy	Tommaso Lequio di Assaba	Trebecco	6	12
5	France	Pierre Bertrand de Bolanda	Papillon	0	12
5	France	Jacques Couderc de Fonlongue	Valangerville	4	12
5	France	Pierre Clavé	Le Trouvère	8	12
6	Portugal	Luís Ivens Ferraz	Marco Visconti	4	12
6	Portugal	Hélder Martins	Avro	4	12
6	Portugal	José de Albuquerque	Hebraico	4	12
7	Germany	Eduard Krüger	Donauwelle	2	14
7	Germany	Richard Sahla	Correggio	4	14
7	Germany	Carl Friedrich von Langen-Parow	Falkner	8	14
8	Switzerland	Charles-Gustave Kuhn	Pepita	0	18
8	Switzerland	Alphonse Gemuseus	Lucette	2	18
8	Switzerland	Pierre de Muralt	Notas	16	18
9	United States	Harry Chamberlin	Nigra	4	22
9	United States	Frank Carr	Miss America	6	22
9	United States	Adolphus Roffe	Fairfax	12	22
10	Netherlands	Gerard de Kruijff	Preten	8	26
10	Netherlands	Antonius Colenbrander	Gaga	8	26
10	Netherlands	Charles Labouchere	Copain	10	26
11	Norway	Knut Gysler	Sans Peur	6	34
11	Norway	Anton Klaveness	Barrabas	12	34
11	Norway	Bjart Ording	Fram I	16	34
12	Argentina	Amabrio del Villar	Talán-Talán	12 1/4	58 1/4
12	Argentina	Raúl Antoli	Turbion	20	58 1/4
12	Argentina	Víctor Fernández	Silencio	26	58 1/4
13	Hungary	Lajos von Malanotti	Ibolya III	12	62
13	Hungary	Antal von Kánya	Gólya	20	62
13	Hungary	Kálmán Cseh von Szent-Katolna	Beni	30	62
14	Belgium	Gaston Mesmaekers	As de Pique	14	64 1/4
14	Belgium	Jacques Misonne	Keepsake	16	64 1/4
14	Belgium	Baudoin De Brabandère	Miss América	34 1/4	64 1/4
AC	Czechoslovakia	František Ventura	Eliot	0	DSQ
AC	Czechoslovakia	Josef Rabas	Daghestan	22 1/2	DSQ
AC	Czechoslovakia	Rudolf Popler	Denk	DSQ	DSQ
