= Equestrian at the 1928 Summer Olympics – Individual jumping =

Equestrian at the Olympics

Individual jumping at the Games of the IX Olympiad
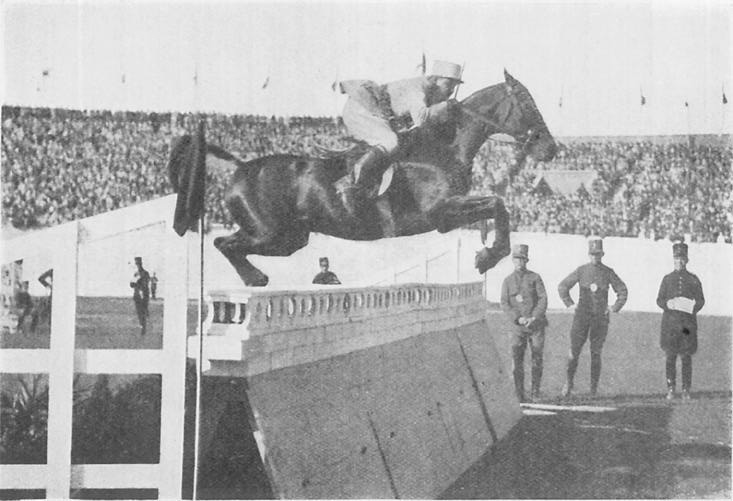
- Pierre Bertran de Balanda, the silver medalist, competing
- Venue: Olympic Stadium
- Date: 12 August 1928
- Competitors: 46 from 16 nations
- Winning score: 0

Medalists
1st place, gold medalist(s)		František Ventura and Eliot; Czechoslovakia
2nd place, silver medalist(s)		Pierre Bertran de Balanda and Papillon; France
3rd place, bronze medalist(s)		Charles-Gustave Kuhn and Pepita; Switzerland

The individual show jumping at the 1928 Summer Olympics took place on 12 August 1928 at the Olympic Stadium in Amsterdam. Scores from the individual competition were summed to give results in the team competition. There were 46 competitors from 16 nations. Each nation could send a team of three riders; 15 nations did so, while Japan had a single rider. The event was won by František Ventura of Czechoslovakia, the nation's first medal in individual jumping. France earned its first medal in the event since 1912 with Pierre Bertran de Balanda's silver. Charles-Gustave Kuhn took bronze, putting Switzerland on the podium for the second consecutive Games.

== Background ==
This was the fifth appearance of the event, which had first been held at the 1900 Summer Olympics and has been held at every Summer Olympics at which equestrian sports have been featured (that is, excluding 1896, 1904, and 1908). It is the oldest event on the current programme, the only one that was held in 1900.

Three of the top 10 riders from the 1924 competition returned: gold medalist Alphonse Gemuseus of Switzerland, silver medalist (and 1920 gold medalist) Tommaso Lequio di Assaba of Italy, and ninth-place finisher José Álvarez de Bohórquez of Spain.

Argentina, Hungary, Japan, and the Netherlands each made their debut in the event. Belgium and France both competed for the fifth time, the only nations to have competed at each appearance of the event to that point.

== Competition format ==
"The obstacles with number 16 as a maximum, the minimum height being 1 m. 25, and the maximum height 1 m. 40 (4’ to 4’ 9”). The canter must be free and at a speed of 400 m. (43 yds.) a minute. The timekeeper shall not take into account greater speed, but on the other hand a lower speed shall be penalised by 0.25 of a point per second over the time allowed. Grazing, displacing or touching the obstacles shall not be taken into account." The course was 720 metres long.

Ties for medal position were broken with re-rides, while all other ties were broken by time.

== Schedule ==
The first round was interrupted by rain and had to be continued on the second day.

Date	Time	Round
Sunday, 12 August 1928	14:00	Final

== Results ==
The course was relatively easy, with seven riders able to finish with no faults. Three of them repeated the feat in the first re-ride, guaranteeing those riders the medals and requiring a second re-ride to determine who would receive which medal. In the second re-ride, some obstacles were raised to 1.60 metres in height to increase the difficulty.

Source: Official results; De Wael

Rank	Rider	Nation	Horse	Time	Faults	1st re-ride	2nd re-ride
1st place, gold medalist(s)	František Ventura	Czechoslovakia	Eliot	1:34	0	0	0
2nd place, silver medalist(s)	Pierre Bertran de Balanda	France	Papillon	1:21	0	0	2
3rd place, bronze medalist(s)	Charles-Gustave Kuhn	Switzerland	Pepita	1:38	0	0	4
4	Kazimierz Gzowski	Poland	Mylord	1:33	0	2	–
5	José Navarro	Spain	Zapatazo	1:36	0	2	–
6	Karl Hansen	Sweden	Gerold	1:39	0	2	–
7	Francesco Forquet	Italy	Capinera	1:33	0	DSQ	–
8	Alphonse Gemuseus	Switzerland	Lucette	1:27	2	–	
9	Carl Björnstjerna	Sweden	Kornett	1:30	2	–	
10	José Álvarez	Spain	Zalamero	1:33	2	–	
11	Eduard Krüger	Germany	Donauwelle	1:33	2	–	
12	Julio García	Spain	Revistade	1:37	2	–	
13	Kazimierz Szosland	Poland	Alli	1:40	2	–	
14	Richard Sahla	Germany	Correggio	1:15	4	–	
15	Luís Ivens Ferraz	Portugal	Marco Visconti	1:26	4	–	
16	Hélder Martins	Portugal	Avro	1:31	4	–	
17	Jacques Couderc de Fonlongue	France	Valangerville	1:34	4	–	
18	Harry Chamberlin	United States	Nigra	1:34	4	–	
19	José de Albuquerque	Portugal	Hebraico	1:42	4	–	
20	Michał Antoniewicz	Poland	Readglet	1:31	6	–	
21	Alessandro Bettoni Cazzago	Italy	Aladino	1:38	6	–	
22	Knut Gysler	Norway	Sans Peur	1:38	6	–	
23	Frank Carr	United States	Miss America	1:38	6	–	
24	Tommaso Lequio di Assaba	Italy	Trebecco	1:48	6	–	
25	Ernst Hallberg	Sweden	Loke	1:31	8	–	
26	Pierre Clavé	France	Le Trouvère	1:33	8	–	
27	Gerard de Kruijff	Netherlands	Preten	1:41	8	–	
28	Carl Friedrich von Langen-Parow	Germany	Falkner	1:42	8	–	
29	Antonius Colenbrander	Netherlands	Gaga	1:46	8	–	
30	Charles Labouchere	Netherlands	Copain	1:44	10	–	
31	Lajos von Malanotti	Hungary	Ibolya III	1:28	12	–	
32	Anton Klaveness	Norway	Barrabas	1:35	12	–	
33	Adolphus Roffe	United States	Fairfax	2:04	12	–	
34	Amabrio del Villar	Argentina	Talán-Talán	1:49	12 1/4	–	
35	Gaston Mesmaekers	Belgium	As de Pique	1:37	14	–	
36	Bjart Ording	Norway	Fram I	1:30	16	–	
37	Pierre de Muralt	Switzerland	Notas	1:48	16	–	
38	Jacques Misonne	Belgium	Keepsake	2:04	16	–	
39	Antal von Kánya	Hungary	Gólya	1:33	20	–	
40	Raúl Antoli	Argentina	Turbion	1:45	20	–	
41	Josef Rabas	Czechoslovakia	Daghestan	2:14	22 1/2	–	
42	Víctor Fernández	Argentina	Silencio	1:27	26	–	
43	Kálmán Cseh von Szent-Katolna	Hungary	Beni	1:56	30	–	
44	Baudoin De Brabandère	Belgium	Miss América	2:29	34 1/4	–	
—	Shigetomo Yoshida	Japan	Kyuzan	DSQ	—		
—	Rudolf Popler	Czechoslovakia	Denk	DSQ	—		
