= Equestrian at the 1924 Summer Olympics – Team jumping =

Equestrian at the Olympics

Team jumping at the Games of the VIII Olympiad
- Venue: Stade Olympique Yves-du-Manoir
- Date: 27 July 1924
- Competitors: 43 from 11 nations

Medalists
1st place, gold medalist(s)		Åge Lundström, Axel Ståhle, Åke Thelning, Georg von Braun	Sweden
2nd place, silver medalist(s)		Hans Bühler, Alphonse Gemuseus, Werner Stuber, Hans von der Weid	Switzerland
3rd place, bronze medalist(s)		José de Albuquerque, Aníbal de Almeida, Luís de Meneses, Hélder Martins	Portugal

The team jumping was one of five equestrianism events on the Equestrian at the 1924 Summer Olympics programme. Scores were the sum of the individual scores for the best three riders of each nation's four-man team. The competition was held on Saturday 27 July 1924. 43 riders from 11 nations competed. Czechoslovakia, with only three individual entrants, was the only nation to not send a full team.

== Results ==
The scores of riders in italics (the fourth-best rider on each team as well as non-finishers) were not counted.

Place	Team	Riders	Faults
1st place, gold medalist(s)	Sweden	Åke Thelning; Axel Ståhle; Åge Lundström; Georg von Braun	42.25
2nd place, silver medalist(s)	Switzerland	Alphonse Gemuseus; Werner Stuber; Hans von der Weid; Hans Bühler	50.00
3rd place, bronze medalist(s)	Portugal	Aníbal de Almeida; Hélder Martins; José de Albuquerque; Luís de Meneses	53.00
4	Belgium	Nicolas LeRoy; Jacques Misonne; Gaston Mesmaekers; Jean Breuls	57.00
5	Italy	Tommaso Lequio di Assaba; Leone Valle; Alessandro Alvisi; Emanuele Beraudo Di Pralormo	57.50
6	Poland	Adam Królikiewicz; Karol von Rómmel; Zdzisław Dziadulski; Kazimierz Szosland	58.50
7	Great Britain	Philip Bowden-Smith; Capel Brunker; Geoffrey Brooke; Keith Hervey	65.75
8	Spain	José Álvarez; Nemesio Martínez; José Navarro; Emilio López	73.75
–	Czechoslovakia	Rudolf Popler; Oldřich Buchar; Josef Rabas	Did not finish
–	France	Pierre Clavé; Michel Bignon; Théophile Carbon; Henri de Royer-Dupré	Did not finish
–	United States	John Barry; Sloan Doak; Frederic Bontecou; Vernon Padgett	Did not finish

== Sources ==
- Wudarski, Pawel (1999). "Wyniki Igrzysk Olimpijskich" (in Polish). Archived from the original on 16 February 2009.
