= Equestrian at the 1928 Summer Olympics – Individual dressage =

Equestrian at the Olympics

Individual dressage at the Games of the IX Olympiad
- Venue: Hilversum
- Competitors: 29 from 12 nations

Medalists
1st place, gold medalist(s)		Carl Freiherr von Langen	Germany
2nd place, silver medalist(s)		Charles Marion	France
3rd place, bronze medalist(s)		Ragnar Olson	Sweden

The individual dressage at the 1928 Summer Olympics took place at Hilversum. The test was the same as for the 1924 Olympics, but the 10-minute limit was now raised to 13 minutes, giving the riders much needed time to complete it without losing points for going over the time allowed. Judging created controversy, both due to nationalistic tendencies by judges and the fact that individual judges had differing opinions on what was correct. While there was discussion on how to make it more fair—including dropping the lowest and highest scores, only having one judge from a neutral county, and removing 20 points from each score given to a countryman of each judge—no changes were made until after the judging scandal at the 1956 Games.

Scores from the individual competition were summed to give results in the team competition.

== Results ==
Source: Official results; De Wael

Rank	Rider	Nation	Horse	Average Score
1st place, gold medalist(s)	Carl Freiherr von Langen	Germany	Draufgänger	237.42
2nd place, silver medalist(s)	Charles Marion	France	Linon	231.00
3rd place, bronze medalist(s)	Ragnar Olson	Sweden	Gunstling	229.78
4	Janne Lundblad	Sweden	Blackmar	226.70
5	Emanuel Thiel	Czechoslovakia	Loki	225.96
6	Hermann Linkenbach	Germany	Gimpel	224.26
7	Robert Wallon	France	Clough-banck	224.08
8	Jan van Reede	Netherlands	Hans	220.70
9	Pierre Versteegh	Netherlands	His Excellence II	216.44
10	Otto Schöninger	Czechoslovakia	Ex	210.28
11	Eugen von Lotzbeck	Germany	Caracalla	208.04
12	Gerard le Heux	Netherlands	Valérine	205.82
13	Arthur von Pongracz	Austria	Turridu	204.28
14	Wilhelm Jaich	Austria	Graf	204.16
15	Adolphe Mercier	Switzerland	Queen-Mary	203.34
16	Magnus Fog	Denmark	Mistinguett	202.08
17	Jaroslav Hanf	Czechoslovakia	Elegán	201.70
18	Vladimir Stoychev	Bulgaria	Pan	200.76
19	Carl, Count Bonde	Sweden	Ingo	194.38
20	Kozeki Okada	Japan	Takushu	193.70
21	Gustav Grachegg	Austria	Daniel	191.96
22	Oskar Frank	Switzerland	Solon	190.62
23	Pierre Danloux	France	Rempart	187.10
24	Oswald Lints	Belgium	Rira-t-elle	185.86
25	Werner Stuber	Switzerland	Ulhard	175.12
26	Paul Michelet	Norway	Benue	170.78
27	Henri Laame	Belgium	Belga	167.70
28	Kohei Yusa	Japan	Sakigake	166.96
29	Roger Delrue	Belgium	Dreypuss	146.14
