= Equestrian at the 1928 Summer Olympics – Team dressage =

Equestrian at the Olympics

Team dressage at the Games of the IX Olympiad
- Venue: Hilversum
- Competitors: 24 (teams) from 8 nations

Medalists
1st place, gold medalist(s)		Carl Freiherr von Langen; Hermann Linkenbach; Eugen Freiherr von Lotzbeck	Germany
2nd place, silver medalist(s)		Ragnar Olson; Janne Lundblad; Carl Bonde	Sweden
3rd place, bronze medalist(s)		Jan van Reede; Pierre Versteegh; Gerard le Heux	Netherlands

The team dressage at the 1928 Summer Olympics took place at Hilversum. Scores from the individual competition were summed to give results in the team competition. 1928 marked the first appearance of the team dressage competition, making it the last of the modern six-event Olympic equestrian programme to appear.

== Results ==
Source: Official results; De Wael

Rank	Nation	Rider	Horse	Average Score	Total Average
1st place, gold medalist(s)	Germany	Carl Freiherr von Langen	Draufgänger	237.42	669.72
1st place, gold medalist(s)	Germany	Hermann Linkenbach	Gimpel	224.26	669.72
1st place, gold medalist(s)	Germany	Eugen von Lotzbeck	Caracalla	208.04	669.72
2nd place, silver medalist(s)	Sweden	Ragnar Olson	Gunstling	229.78	650.86
2nd place, silver medalist(s)	Sweden	Janne Lundblad	Blackmar	226.70	650.86
2nd place, silver medalist(s)	Sweden	Carl, Count Bonde	Ingo	194.38	650.86
3rd place, bronze medalist(s)	Netherlands	Jan van Reede	Hans	220.70	642.96
3rd place, bronze medalist(s)	Netherlands	Pierre Versteegh	His Excellence II	216.44	642.96
3rd place, bronze medalist(s)	Netherlands	Gerard le Heux	Valérine	205.82	642.96
4	France	Charles Marion	Linon	231.00	642.18
4	France	Robert Wallon	Clough-banck	224.08	642.18
4	France	Pierre Danloux	Rempart	187.10	642.18
5	Czechoslovakia	Emanuel Thiel	Loki	225.96	637.94
5	Czechoslovakia	Otto Schöninger	Ex	210.28	637.94
5	Czechoslovakia	Jaroslav Hanf	Elegán	201.70	637.94
6	Austria	Arthur von Pongracz	Turridu	204.28	600.40
6	Austria	Wilhelm Jaich	Graf	204.16	600.40
6	Austria	Gustav Grachegg	Daniel	191.96	600.40
7	Switzerland	Adolphe Mercier	Queen-Mary	203.34	569.08
7	Switzerland	Oskar Frank	Solon	190.62	569.08
7	Switzerland	Werner Stuber	Ulhard	175.12	569.08
8	Belgium	Oswald Lints	Rira-t-elle	185.86	449.70
8	Belgium	Henri Laame	Belga	167.70	449.70
8	Belgium	Roger Delrue	Dreypuss	146.14	449.70
