= Portugal at the 1924 Summer Olympics =

- IOC code: POR
- NOC: Olympic Committee of Portugal

in Paris
- Competitors: 30 in 8 sports
- Flag bearer: António Martins
- Officials: 6
- Medals Ranked 23rd: Gold 0 Silver 0 Bronze 1 Total 1

Summer Olympics appearances (overview)
- 1912; 1920; 1924; 1928; 1932; 1936; 1948; 1952; 1956; 1960; 1964; 1968; 1972; 1976; 1980; 1984; 1988; 1992; 1996; 2000; 2004; 2008; 2012; 2016; 2020; 2024

Portugal competed at the 1924 Summer Olympics in Paris, France. It was the nation's third appearance at the Olympics, after debuting in 1912.

A delegation of thirty competitors (biggest at the time) participated in eight sports, with the equestrian team winning the nation's first ever Olympic medal.

== Medalists ==
Medal	Name	Sport	Event	Date
Bronze	António Borges, Hélder de Souza, José Mouzinho	Equestrian	Team jumping	July 27

== Results by event ==
=== Athletics ===
Men's 100m:

- Gentil dos Santos — 1st round (2nd heat)
- Karel Pott — 1st round (8th heat)

Men's 200m:

- Gentil dos Santos — 1st round (10th heat)

Men's Discus Throw:

- António Martins da Silva — 1st round: 12th (32,40m)

=== Equestrian ===
Men's Individual Jumping:

- Aníbal de Almeida — 5th (12 faults)
- Hélder de Souza — 12th (19 faults)
- José Mouzinho — 17th (22 faults)
- Luís Cardoso de Menezes — non qualified

Men's Team Jumping:

- António Borges, Hélder de Souza, José Mouzinho (and Luís Cardoso de Menezes) (53 faults) — Bronze

=== Fencing ===
Men's Individual Foil:

- Gil de Andrade — 1/4 finals: 6th (poule 1)
- Manuel Queiróz — 1/4 finals: 6th (poule 2)

Men's Individual Épée:

- António de Menezes — 1st round: (poule 7)
- Ruimondo Mayer — 1/4 finals: 7th (poule 2)
- Mário de Noronha — 1/2 finals: 7th (poule 1)
- Frederico Paredes — 1/4 finals: 8th (poule 1)

Men's Team Épée:

- António Leite, António Mascarenhas de Menezes, Frederico Paredes, Henrique da Silveira, Jorge de Paiva, Mário de Noronha, Paulo d'Eça Leal, and Ruimondo Mayer — 4th

=== Sailing ===
Men's Olympic Monotype:

- Frederico Guilherme Burnay — 8th

=== Shooting ===
Men's Individual 600m Free Rifle:

- António Ferreira — 57th
- Dario Canas — 62nd
- Francisco António Real — 69th
- Manuel Guerra — 71st

Men's Individual 50m Rifle Prone (60 shots):

- António Martins — 23rd
- António Ferreira — 56th
- Francisco Mendonça — 50th
- Francisco António Real — 62nd

Men's Individual 25m Rapid Fire Pistol (60 shots):

- António Martins — 16th
- António Ferreira — 44th
- A. Duarte Montez — 32nd
- Francisco Mendonça — 17th

Men's Team 400, 600, 800m Free Rifle:

- António Martins, António Ferreira, António Ferreira, Dario Canas, Francisco António Real, Félix Bermudes and Manuel Guerra — 17th (427 points)

=== Swimming ===
Men

Athlete	Event	Heat		Semifinal		Final	
Athlete	Event	Time	Rank	Time	Rank	Time	Rank
Mário Marques	200 m breaststroke	3:32.4	28	Did not advance			

=== Tennis ===
Men's Singles:

- Rodrigo Castro Pereira — 1st round

=== Weightlifting ===
Men's Feather Weight (–60 kg):

- A. Pereira — non qualified

== Officials ==
- José Pontes, Nobre Guedes, Salazar Carreira (chiefs of mission)
- João Sassetti (fencing)
- Gil d'Andrade (fencing)
- C. de Mello (weightlifting)

== Sources ==
- Official Olympic Reports
- International Olympic Committee results database
