= Equestrian at the 1924 Summer Olympics – Individual dressage =

Equestrian at the Olympics

Individual dressage at the Games of the VIII Olympiad
- Venue: Stade Olympique Yves-du-Manoir
- Date: 25 July
- Competitors: 24 from 9 nations

Medalists
| 1st place, gold medalist(s) | | Ernst Linder | Sweden |
| 2nd place, silver medalist(s) | | Bertil Sandström | Sweden |
| 3rd place, bronze medalist(s) | | Xavier Lesage | France |

The individual dressage was one of five equestrianism events on the Equestrian at the 1924 Summer Olympics programme. The competition was held on Thursday, 25 July 1924. 24 riders from nine nations competed.

== Results ==
| Place | Rider | Score |
|---|---|---|
| 1st place, gold medalist(s) | Ernst Linder (SWE) | 276.4 |
| 2nd place, silver medalist(s) | Bertil Sandström (SWE) | 275.8 |
| 3rd place, bronze medalist(s) | Xavier Lesage (FRA) | 265.8 |
| 4 | Wilhelm von Essen (SWE) | 260.0 |
| 5 | Victor Ankarcrona (SWE) | 256.5 |
| 6 | Emanuel Thiel (TCH) | 256.2 |
| 7 | Robert Wallon (FRA) | 243.2 |
| 7 | Henri von der Weid (SUI) | 243.2 |
| 9 | Georges Serlez (BEL) | 242.0 |
| 10 | Léon Saint-Fort Paillard (FRA) | 237.0 |
| 11 | František Donda (TCH) | 236.0 |
| 12 | Arthur von Pongracz (AUT) | 234.2 |
| 13 | Joseph Stevenart (BEL) | 233.2 |
| 14 | Jan van Reede (NED) | 232.0 |
| 15 | Albert Bourcier (FRA) | 228.0 |
| 16 | Adolphe Mercier (SUI) | 223.6 |
| 17 | Vladimir Stoychev (BUL) | 220.2 |
| 18 | Otto Schöniger (TCH) | 215.0 |
| 19 | Jaroslav Hanf (TCH) | 213.4 |
| 20 | Werner Stuber (SUI) | 206.2 |
| 21 | Charles Schlumberger (SUI) | 189.4 |
| 22 | Dagobert Sekullic (AUT) | 179.8 |
| 23 | Roger Delrue (BEL) | 170.8 |
| 24 | Vladimir Seunig (YUG) | 167.6 |

== Sources ==
- Kubatko, Justin. "Equestrianism at the 1924 Paris Summer Games: Men's Dressage, Individual". Olympics at Sports-Reference.com. Archived from the original on 18 April 2020.
- Wudarski, Pawel (1999). "Wyniki Igrzysk Olimpijskich" (in Polish). Archived from the original on 16 February 2009.
