= Portugal at the 1932 Summer Olympics =

- IOC code: POR
- NOC: Olympic Committee of Portugal

in Los Angeles
- Competitors: 6 in 3 sports
- Officials: 1
- Medals: Gold 0 Silver 0 Bronze 0 Total 0

Summer Olympics appearances (overview)
- 1912; 1920; 1924; 1928; 1932; 1936; 1948; 1952; 1956; 1960; 1964; 1968; 1972; 1976; 1980; 1984; 1988; 1992; 1996; 2000; 2004; 2008; 2012; 2016; 2020; 2024

Portugal competed at the 1932 Summer Olympics in Los Angeles, United States. It was the nation's fifth appearance at the Olympics, after debuting in 1912.

A delegation of six competitors (all men) participated in three sports (lowest since Stockholm 1912); however, no medal was won.

== Athletics ==
Men's 100m:

- António Sarsfield Rodrigues — 1st round: 5th (heat 1)

== Modern pentathlon ==
Two male pentathletes represented Portugal in 1932.

Men's Individual Competition:

- Rafael Afonso de Sousa — 22nd (102 points)
  1. Horse riding — 21st (111,5 points)
  2. Fencing (individual sword) — 23rd (10 points)
  3. Shooting (pistol) — 17th (176 points)
  4. Swimming (300m free-style) — 21st (6.42,1 min)
  5. Cross-country — 20th (19.09,0 min)
- Sebastião de Freitas Branco de Herédia — 23rd (106 points)
  1. Horse riding — 22nd (466 points)
  2. Fencing (individual sword) — 17th (18 points)
  3. Shooting (pistol) — 24th (130 points)
  4. Swimming (300m free-style) — 20th (6.17,4 min)
  5. Cross-country — 23rd (20.15,6 min)

== Shooting ==
Men's 25m Rapid Fire Pistol (60 shots):

- José Maria Ferreira — 7th
- Rafael Afonso de Sousa — 9th

Men's 50m Rifle Prone:

- Francisco António Real — 7th
- José Maria Ferreira — 23rd
- Manuel Guerra — 20th

== Officials ==
- César de Melo (chief of mission)
- Francisco António Real (shooting)
