= Emilio López =

Emilio López may refer to:

- Emilio López (basketball) (born 1923), Mexican former basketball player
- Emilio López (equestrian) (1892-1958), Spanish Olympic equestrian
- Emilio López Adán (born 1946), Spanish doctor and writer
- Emilio López (Spanish footballer) (born 1965), Spanish former footballer
- Emilio López (Mexican footballer) (born 1986), Mexican footballer
