= António Martins =

António Martins may refer to:

- António Martins (footballer) (1913–?), Portuguese footballer
- António Martins (sport shooter, born 1892) (1892–1930), Portuguese Olympic sports shooter
- António Martins (sport shooter, born 1930), Portuguese Olympic sports shooter and son of the above

== See also ==
- Antônio Martins, a municipality in Rio Grande do Norte, Brazil
