= Rafael Souza =

Rafael Souza or Rafael Sousa may refer to:

- Rafa Sousa (born 1988), Portuguese footballer
- Rafael Afonso de Sousa (born 1900), Portuguese modern pentathlete and shooter
- Rafael de Souza (basketball) (born 1988), basketball player in Brazil national basketball team
- Rafael de Souza (canoeist) in 2015 Canoe Slalom World Cup
- Rafael de Souza (futsal) in 2014 AFC Futsal Club Championship
- Rafael Diego de Souza (born 1986), Brazilian footballer
- Rafael Galhardo de Souza (born 1991), Brazilian footballer
- Rafael Sousa (Portuguese cyclist), Portuguese cyclo-cross cyclist
