= Luís de Meneses =

Luís de Meneses may refer to

- D. Luís de Meneses, 2nd Count of Tarouca (c. 1570 - 1617), Portuguese governor of Tangier
- D. Luís de Noronha e Meneses (c. 1570 - ?), 7th Marquis of Vila Real, Portuguese governor of Tangier, Portuguese governor of Ceuta
- D. Luís de Meneses, 3rd Count of Ericeira (1632-1690), creator of the Cacheu and Cape Verde Company
- Luís de Meneses (equestrian) (1902-1978), Portuguese Olympic equestrian
