= Manuel Guerra =

Manuel Guerra may refer to:

- Manuel Guerra (sport shooter) (1889–?), Portuguese sport shooter
- Manuel Guerra (swimmer) (1928–2020), Spanish swimmer
- Manuel Guerra Jr. (born 1967), American ice sledge hockey player
