= Kohei Yusa =

Japanese equestrian

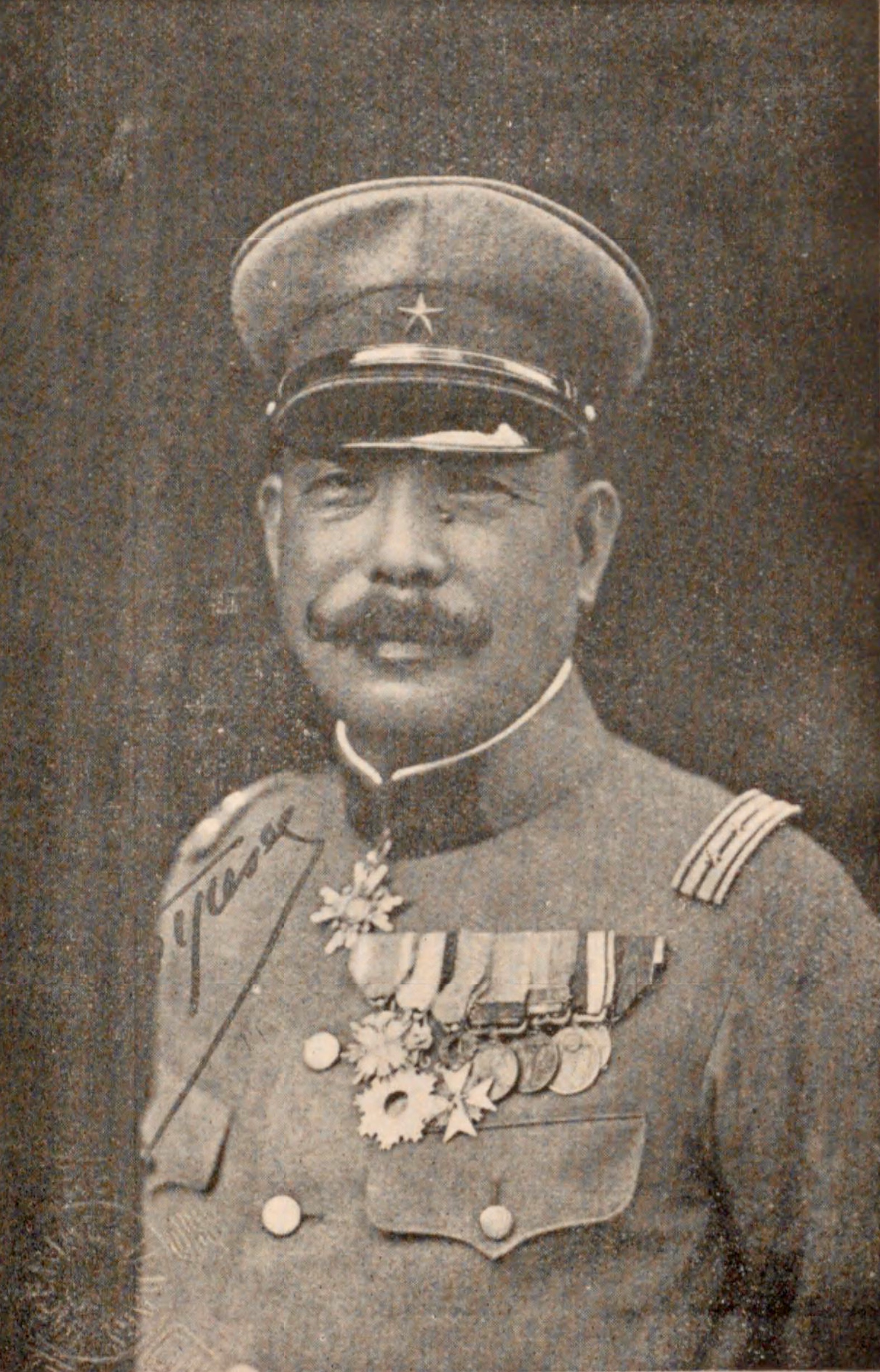
- Kōhei Yusa in 1932

Personal information
- Nationality: Japanese
- Born: 25 July 1883; Naruko, Japan
- Died: 25 November 1966 (aged 83); Tokyo, Japan

Sport
- Sport: Equestrian

Kohei Yusa (25 July 1883 – 25 November 1966) was a Japanese equestrian. He competed in the individual dressage event at the 1928 Summer Olympics.
