= Dagobert Sekullic =

Austrian equestrian

Personal information
- Nationality: Austrian
- Born: 9 March 1889
- Died: 1965 (aged 75–76)

Sport
- Sport: Equestrian

Dagobert Sekullic (9 March 1889 – 1965) was an Austrian equestrian. He competed in the individual dressage event at the 1924 Summer Olympics.
