= František Donda =

Czech equestrian

Personal information
- Nationality: Czech
- Born: 1890
- Died: Unknown

Sport
- Sport: Equestrian

František Donda (born 1890, date of death unknown) was a Czech equestrian. He competed in the individual dressage event at the 1924 Summer Olympics.
