= Albert Bourcier (equestrian) =

French equestrian

Personal information
- Nationality: French
- Born: 16 October 1879; Illeville-sur-Montfort, France
- Died: 2 February 1971 (aged 91); Versailles, France

Sport
- Sport: Equestrian

Albert Bourcier (16 October 1879 – 2 February 1971) was a French equestrian. He competed in the individual dressage event at the 1924 Summer Olympics.
