= Léon Saint-Fort Paillard =

French equestrian

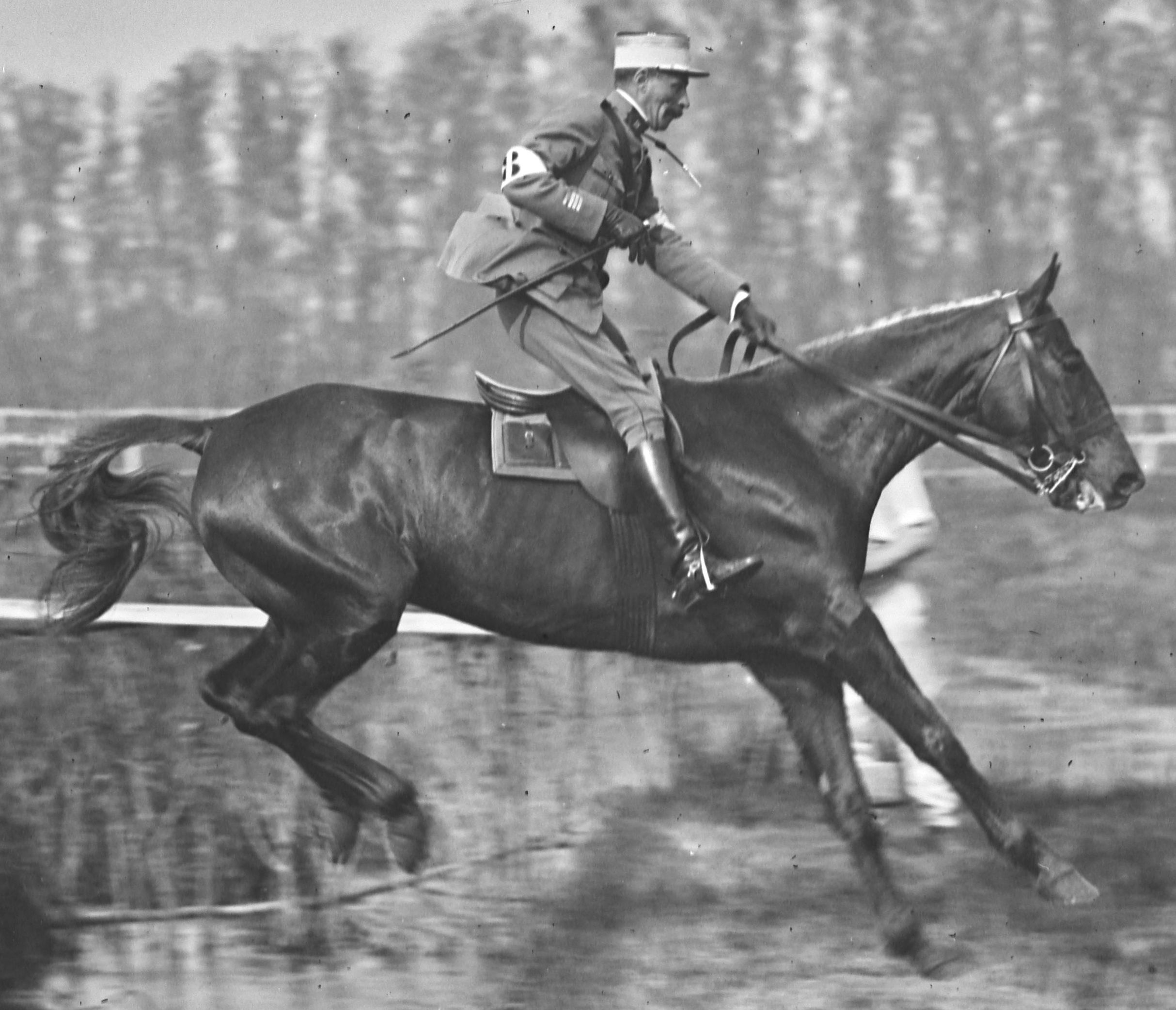
- Léon Saint-Fort Paillard and his horse Roitelet VI, April 1923.

Personal information
- Nationality: French
- Born: 6 July 1879; Cossé-le-Vivien, France
- Died: 25 January 1928 (aged 48)

Sport
- Sport: Equestrian

Léon Saint-Fort Paillard (6 July 1879 – 25 January 1928) was a French equestrian. He competed in the individual dressage event at the 1924 Summer Olympics.
