= Joseph Stevenart =

Belgian equestrian

Personal information
- Nationality: Belgian
- Born: 20 February 1890
- Died: 30 August 1976 (aged 86)

Sport
- Sport: Equestrian

Joseph Stevenart (20 February 1890 – 30 August 1976) was a Belgian equestrian. He competed in the individual dressage event at the 1924 Summer Olympics.
