= Vladimir Seunig =

Slovenian equestrian

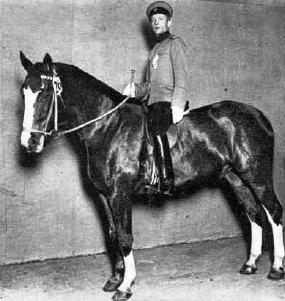

Personal information
- Nationality: Slovenian
- Born: 8 August 1887; Ljubljana, Austria-Hungary
- Died: 24 December 1976 (aged 89)

Sport
- Sport: Equestrian

Vladimir Seunig (8 August 1887 – 24 December 1976) was a Slovenian equestrian. He competed in the individual dressage event at the 1924 Summer Olympics.

He is better known as Waldemar Seunig, author of Horsemanship: A Comprehensive Book on Training the Horse and Its Rider still in print in 2023, as a foundational book in dressage training for both rider and mount.
