= Shigetomo Yoshida =

Japanese equestrian

Personal information
- Nationality: Japanese
- Born: 13 April 1890

Sport
- Sport: Equestrian

Shigetomo Yoshida (born 13 April 1890, date of death unknown) was a Japanese equestrian. He competed in the individual jumping event at the 1928 Summer Olympics.
