= Georges Serlez =

Belgian equestrian

Personal information
- Nationality: Belgian
- Born: 27 March 1888; Kortrijk, Belgium
- Died: 19 March 1978 (aged 89); Brussels, Belgium

Sport
- Sport: Equestrian

Georges Serlez (27 March 1888 – 19 March 1978) was a Belgian equestrian. He competed in the individual dressage event at the 1924 Summer Olympics.
