= Kozeki Okada =

Japanese equestrian

Personal information
- Nationality: Japanese
- Born: 19 July 1886

Sport
- Sport: Equestrian

Kozeki Okada (born 19 July 1886, date of death unknown) was a Japanese equestrian. He competed in the individual dressage event at the 1928 Summer Olympics.
