= Charles Schlumberger (equestrian) =

Swiss equestrian

Personal information
- Full name: Charles Amédée Schlumberger
- Nationality: Swiss
- Born: 19 May 1893; Basel, Switzerland
- Died: 1984 (aged 90–91)

Sport
- Sport: Equestrian

Charles Amédée Schlumberger (19 May 1893 – 1984) was a Swiss equestrian. He competed in the individual dressage event at the 1924 Summer Olympics.
