= Lajos von Malanotti =

Hungarian equestrian

Personal information
- Nationality: Hungarian
- Born: 19 August 1883 Bárdudvarnok, Austria-Hungary
- Died: 27 August 1948 (aged 65) Budapest, Hungary

Sport
- Sport: Equestrian

Lajos Gejza von Malanotti (19 August 1883 – 27 August 1948) was a Hungarian equestrian. He competed in two events at the 1928 Summer Olympics. Malanotti committed suicide in 1948.
