= Pierre de Muralt =

Swiss equestrian

Personal information
- Nationality: Swiss
- Born: 6 November 1896; Vevey, Switzerland
- Died: 20 April 1985 (aged 88); Bardonnex, Switzerland

Sport
- Sport: Equestrian

Pierre de Muralt (6 November 1896 – 20 April 1985) was a Swiss equestrian. He competed in two events at the 1928 Summer Olympics.
