= Charles Labouchere =

Dutch equestrian

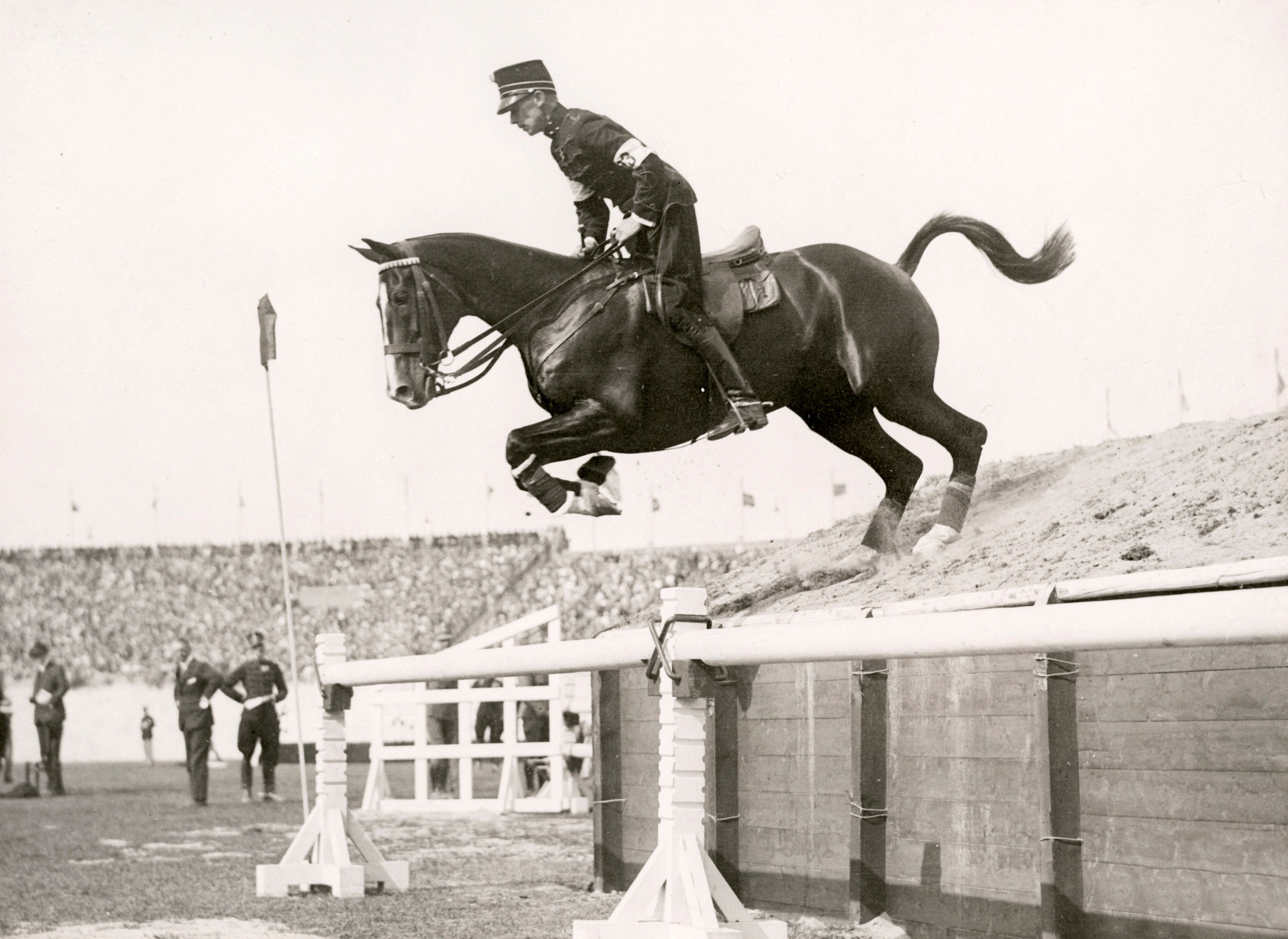

Personal information
- Nationality: Dutch
- Born: 10 April 1880; Doorn, Netherlands
- Died: 12 October 1966 (aged 86); Zeist, Netherlands

Sport
- Sport: Equestrian

Charles Labouchere (10 April 1880 – 12 October 1966) was a Dutch equestrian. He competed in two events at the 1928 Summer Olympics.
