= Antal von Kánya =

Hungarian equestrian

Personal information
- Nationality: Hungarian
- Born: 6 September 1893; Győr, Austria-Hungary
- Died: 9 March 1967 (aged 73); Szombathely, Hungary

Sport
- Sport: Equestrian

Antal von Kánya (6 September 1893 – 9 March 1967) was a Hungarian equestrian. He competed in two events at the 1928 Summer Olympics.
