= Eduard Krüger (equestrian) =

German equestrian

Personal information
- Nationality: German
- Born: 24 March 1893; Metz, France
- Died: 5 November 1963 (aged 70); Munich, Germany

Sport
- Sport: Equestrian

Eduard Krüger (24 March 1893 – 5 November 1963) was a German equestrian. He competed in two events at the 1928 Summer Olympics.
