= Adolphus Roffe =

American equestrian

Personal information
- Born: November 6, 1890 Independence, Missouri, United States
- Died: December 31, 1968 (aged 78) Houston, Missouri, United States

Sport
- Sport: Equestrian

Adolphus Roffe (November 6, 1890 – December 31, 1968) was an American equestrian. He competed in two events at the 1928 Summer Olympics.
