= Francisco Mendonça =

Portuguese sports shooter

Personal information
- Born: 25 January 1886

Sport
- Sport: Sports shooting

Francisco Mendonça (born 25 January 1886, date of death unknown) was a Portuguese sports shooter. He competed in two events at the 1924 Summer Olympics.
