= Emilio López Adán =

Spanish doctor and writer

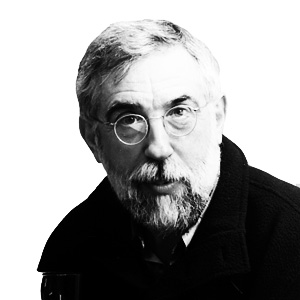
- Born: January 15, 1946 (age 80); Vitoria
- Occupation: Doctor
- Writing career
- Language: Basque

Emilio Lopez Adan (born 15 January 1946) is a doctor and Basque writer. He has published numerous works on Basque nationalism and the history of the Basque Country.

== Life ==
Adán was born in Vitoria, Alava. During Franco's era, he was a member of ETA, from 1963 to 1974. At that time he was a "Pravi" and was a member of the Tactical Executive Committee (KET). From the Assembly held in 1966, he maintained a standalone attitude within the labor-internationalization. Since 1968 he has been living in exile. From 1969 he worked as a "Conflict". He signed the manifesto "Euskadi eta Askatasuna" (1970).

== Works ==
Among his works include: El Nacionalismo Vasco (1876–1936), Mugalde, Henday (1974); El Nacionalismo Vasco y Clases Sociales (The Basque Nationalism and Social Classes) (1976) (Awarded in the book workshops of San Sebastián and Durango); The Basque Nationalism in exile (1936–1960) (1977); From Carlism to Bourgeois Nationalism (1978); Get Gordon Lainope (1982); Seventh daughter (1984), and a collection of ten stories set in different periods.

He has worked in various magazines, radio and television in support, culture, politics and society.
