= Gentil dos Santos =

Portuguese sprinter

Personal information
- Nationality: Portuguese
- Born: 19 May 1899

Sport
- Sport: Track and field
- Events: 100m, 200m

Gentil dos Santos (born 19 May 1899, date of death unknown) was a Portuguese sprinter. He competed in the men's 100 metres and the 200 metres events at the 1924 Summer Olympics. He was born in Guinea-Bissau, son of a Portuguese father and of a Guinean mother.
