= Francesco Forquet =

Italian equestrian

Personal information
- Nationality: Italian
- Born: 25 August 1886 Naples, Italy
- Died: 28 April 1972 (aged 85) Siena, Italy

Sport
- Sport: Equestrian

Francesco Forquet (25 August 1886 – 28 April 1972) was an Italian equestrian. He competed in two events at the 1928 Summer Olympics.
