= Amabrio del Villar =

Argentine equestrian

Personal information
- Nationality: Argentine
- Born: 1896

Sport
- Sport: Equestrian
Medal record
Equestrian
Representing Argentina
Pan American Games
Silver medal – second place	1951 Buenos Aires	Team dressage

Amabrio del Villar (born 1896, date of death unknown) was an Argentine equestrian. He competed in two events at the 1928 Summer Olympics.
