= António Martins (sport shooter, born 1930) =

Portuguese sports shooter

Personal information
- Born: 10 July 1930 (age 95) Lisbon, Portugal

Sport
- Sport: Sports shooting

António Martins (born 10 July 1930) is a Portuguese former sports shooter. He competed in the 25 metre pistol event at the 1960 Summer Olympics. His father also represented Portugal at the Olympics as a sports shooter.
