= Richard Sahla (equestrian) =

German equestrian

Personal information
- Nationality: German
- Born: 8 April 1900; Bückeburg, Germany
- Died: 6 April 1942 (aged 41); Chudovo, Russia

Sport
- Sport: Equestrian

Richard Sahla (8 April 1900 – 6 April 1942) was a German equestrian. He competed in two events at the 1928 Summer Olympics. He was killed in action during World War II.
