= Kálmán Cseh von Szent-Katolna =

Hungarian equestrian

Personal information
- Nationality: Hungarian
- Born: 28 November 1892 Budapest, Austria-Hungary
- Died: 14 March 1986 (aged 93) Budapest, Hungary

Sport
- Sport: Equestrian

Kálmán Cseh von Szent-Katolna (28 November 1892 – 14 March 1986) was a Hungarian equestrian. He competed in four events at the 1928 Summer Olympics.

== Personal life ==
Cseh served as an officer in the Royal Hungarian Army. During the Second World War, he was the commandant of the Dawidowa concentration camp where his fellow Olympian Attila Petschauer was a prisoner and submitted him to sadistic treatments. In winter Cseh forced Attila to fetch water for the kitchen barefoot or to sleep naked on trees with water poured over him as well as having guards beat him with a wire whip so severely that his spine was exposed.

In 1944/45 he participated in the resistance movement. The Nazis locked him up and deported him to the West.
