= Jacques Couderc de Fonlongue =

French equestrian

Personal information
- Nationality: French
- Born: 2 September 1891
- Died: 28 December 1986 (aged 95)

Sport
- Sport: Equestrian

Jacques Couderc de Fonlongue (2 September 1891 – 28 December 1986) was a French equestrian. He competed in two events at the 1928 Summer Olympics.
