= Oskar Frank =

Swiss equestrian

Personal information
- Nationality: Swiss
- Born: 1894
- Died: 1963 (aged 68–69)

Sport
- Sport: Equestrian

Oskar Frank (1894 – 1963) was a Swiss equestrian. He competed in two events at the 1928 Summer Olympics.
