= Henri de Royer-Dupré =

French equestrian

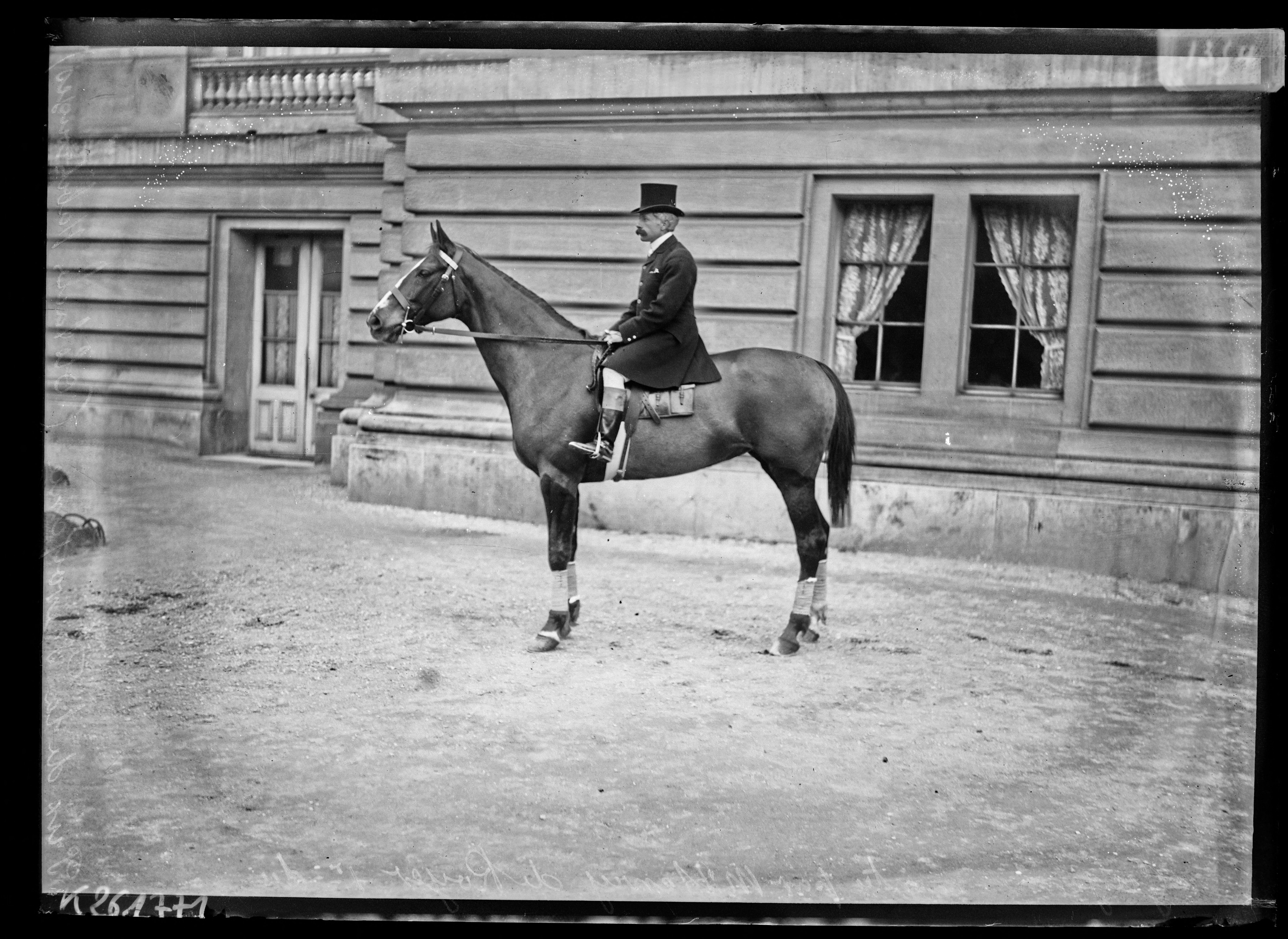

Personal information
- Nationality: French
- Born: 29 October 1876 Chartres, France
- Died: 8 December 1960 (aged 84) Villiers-Saint, France

Sport
- Sport: Equestrian

Henri de Royer-Dupré (29 October 1876 – 8 December 1960) was a French equestrian. He competed in two events at the 1924 Summer Olympics.
