= Nemesio Martínez =

Spanish equestrian

Personal information
- Nationality: Spanish
- Born: 21 March 1897; Infiesto, Spain
- Died: 26 July 1936 (aged 39)

Sport
- Sport: Equestrian

Nemesio Martínez (21 March 1897 – 26 July 1936) was a Spanish equestrian. He competed in two events at the 1924 Summer Olympics.
