= Nicolas LeRoy =

Belgian equestrian

Personal information
- Nationality: Belgian
- Born: 16 September 1888
- Died: 31 October 1974 (aged 86)

Sport
- Sport: Equestrian

Nicolas LeRoy (16 September 1888 – 31 October 1974) was a Belgian equestrian. He competed in two events at the 1924 Summer Olympics.
