= Julio García Fernández de los Ríos =

Spanish horse rider (1894–1969)

Julio García
Personal information
- Full name: Julio García Fernández de los Ríos
- Born: 31 December 1894 Reinosa, Cantabria, Spain
- Died: 29 July 1969 (aged 74) Madrid, Spain
Medal record
Equestrian
Representing Spain
Olympic Games
Gold medal – first place	1928 Amsterdam	Team jumping

Julio García Fernández de los Ríos (31 December 1894 in Reinosa, Cantabria – 29 July 1969 in Madrid) was a Spanish horse rider. He competed in the 1928 Summer Olympics.

García won the gold medal as part of the Spanish team in the team jumping with his horse Revistade after finishing twelfth in the individual jumping, being the first Cantabrian medallist ever.

He was president and president of honor of the Spanish Equestrian Federation.
