= Rafael Afonso de Sousa =

Portuguese modern pentathlete and shooter (born 1900)

Personal information
- Born: 16 May 1900
- Died: 20 October 1982 (aged 82)

Sport
- Sport: Modern pentathlon, sports shooting

Rafael Afonso de Sousa (16 May 1900 – 20 October 1982) was a Portuguese modern pentathlete and sports shooter. He competed at the 1932 Summer Olympics.
