= Carl Björnstjerna =

Swedish equestrian

Count Carl Björnstjerna
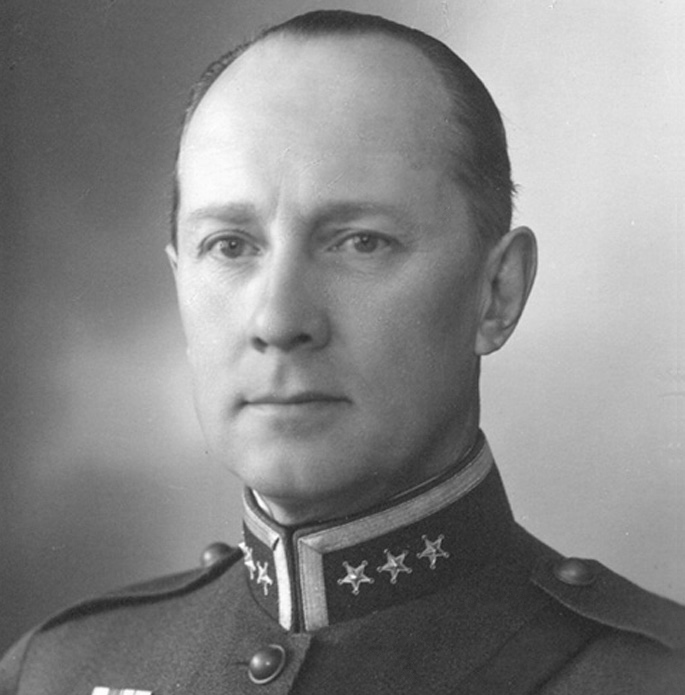
- Born: Carl Johan Magnus Björnstjerna; 7 April 1886; Stockholm, Sweden
- Died: 20 February 1982 (aged 95); Stockholm, Sweden
- Military career
- Branch: Swedish Army
- Service years: 1909–1941
- Rank: Colonel
- Commands: Norrland Dragoon Regiment (1935–40)

Count Carl Johan Magnus Björnstjerna (7 April 1886 – 20 February 1982) was a Swedish officer and horse rider who competed in the 1928 Summer Olympics. He and his horse Kornett won the bronze medal as part of the Swedish jumping team after finishing ninth in the individual jumping.

== Career ==
Björnstjerna was born on 7 April 1886 in Stockholm, Sweden, the son of colonel, count Gustaf Björnstjerna and his wife Ellen Jonzon.

== Career ==
Björnstjerna became a lieutenant in the Life Regiment Dragoons in 1909 and was promoted to ryttmästare in 1921. He then served as a staff adjutant and captain of the General Staff in 1921 and as ryttmästare and squadron commander in the Life Regiment Dragoons in 1925. Björnstjerna was appointed chief adjutant and major of the General Staff in 1928 and then served as head of the General Staff's Foreign Department from 1930. He was promoted to lieutenant colonel and was posted as military attaché in London, Paris and Brussels from 1933 to 1935. Björnstjerna was promoted to colonel in 1935 and served as commanding officer of Norrland Dragoon Regiment from 1935 to 1940. He transferred to the reserve in 1946.

== Personal life ==
Björnstjerna was married 1915–1954 to Sonja Wallenberg (1881–1970), the daughter of Marcus Wallenberg Sr. and Amalia Hagdahl. They had four daughters. In 1956 he married Ulla Nilsson.

== Dates of rank ==
- 1909 – Lieutenant
- 1921 – Ryttmästare
- 1928 – Major
- 1933 – Lieutenant colonel
- 1935 – Colonel

== Awards and decorations ==
Björnstjerna's awards:

=== Swedish ===
- (Sweden) King Gustaf V's Jubilee Commemorative Medal (1928)
- (Sweden) Commander 1st Class of the Order of the Sword (15 November 1941)
- (Sweden) Knight of the Order of Vasa
- (Sweden) Knight of the Order of Saint John

=== Foreign ===
- (Estonia) 3rd Class of the Order of the Cross of the Eagle
- Commander 2nd Class of the Order of the White Rose of Finland
- (Latvia) Commander of the Order of the Three Stars
- (United Kingdom) Commander of the Order of the British Empire
- (Denmark) Knight of the Order of the Dannebrog
- (France) Officer of the Legion of Honour
- (Lithuania) Officer of the Order of the Lithuanian Grand Duke Gediminas
- (Netherlands) Officer of the Order of Orange-Nassau with swords
- (Norway) Knight 1st Class of the Order of St. Olav
- (Poland) Officer of the Order of Polonia Restituta
- (Belgium) Knight of the Order of Leopold with swords
- Knight of the Order of the Crown of Italy
