= Jean Breuls van Tiecken =

Belgian equestrian

Personal information
- Nationality: Belgian
- Born: 10 January 1899; Liège, Belgium
- Died: 8 July 1967 (aged 68); Etterbeek, Belgium

Sport
- Sport: Equestrian

Jean Breuls van Tiecken (10 January 1899 – 8 July 1967) was a Belgian equestrian. He competed in two events at the 1924 Summer Olympics.
