= Théophile Carbon =

French equestrian

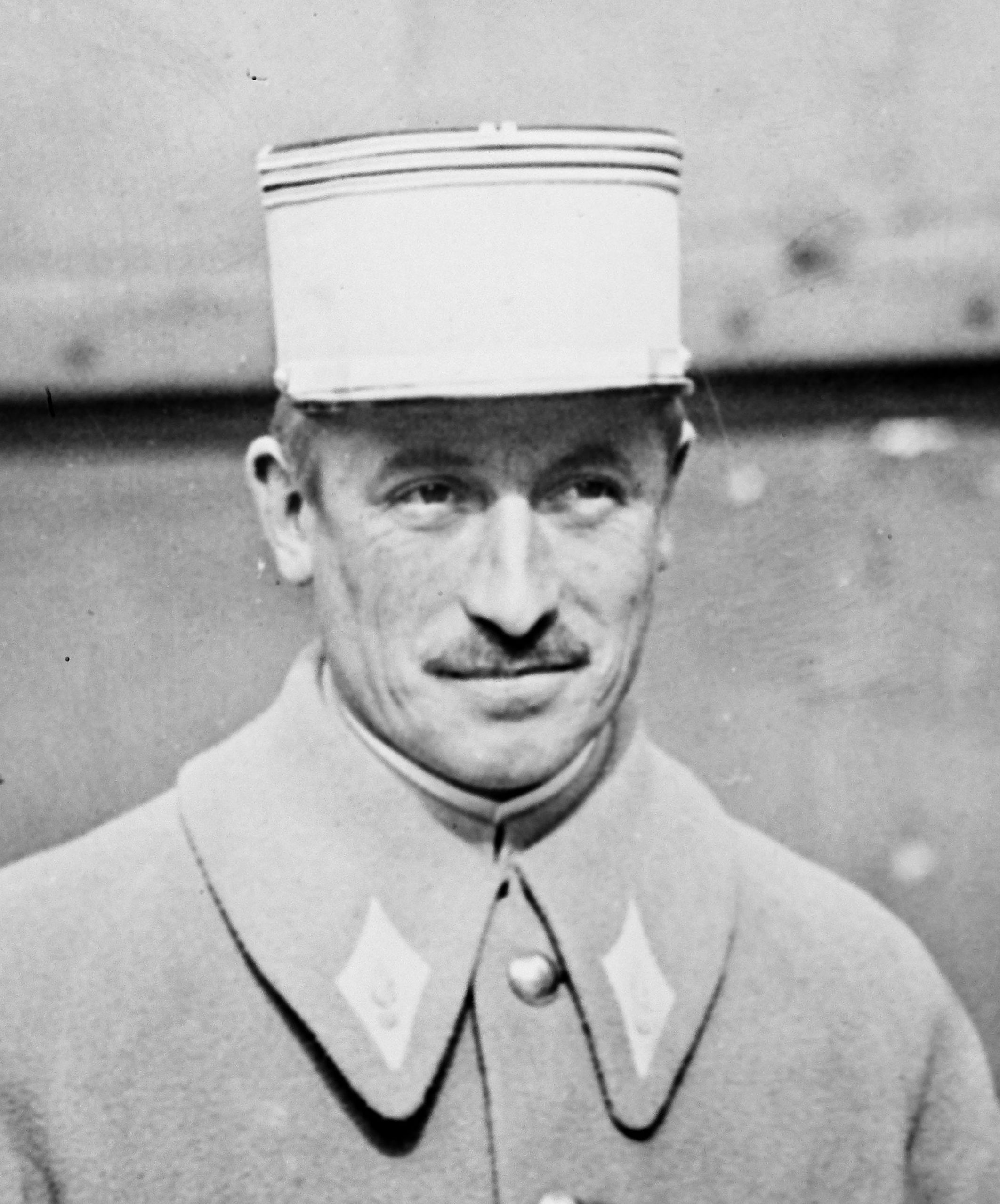
- Théophile Carbon in 1927

Personal information
- Full name: Théophile Arthur Cornil Carbon
- Nationality: French
- Born: 24 July 1895 Vervins, France
- Died: 28 October 1951 (aged 56) Paris, France

Sport
- Sport: Equestrian

Théophile Carbon (24 July 1895 – 28 October 1951) was a French equestrian. He competed at the 1920 Summer Olympics and the 1924 Summer Olympics.
