= Axel Ståhle =

Swedish equestrian

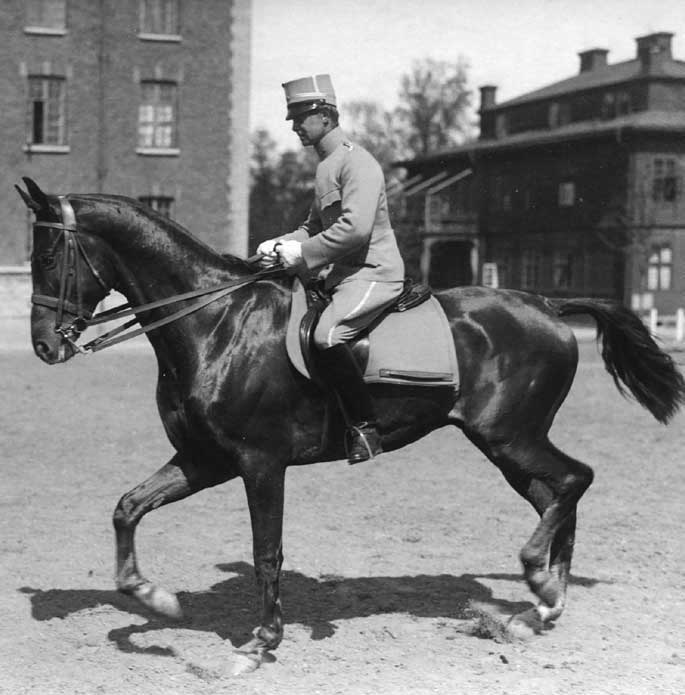

Personal information
- Full name: Axel Reinhold Ståhle
- Born: 1 February 1891 Helsingborg, Sweden
- Died: 21 November 1987 (aged 96) Malmö, Sweden

Sport
- Sport: Horse riding
- Club: K6 IF, Ystad
Medal record
Representing Sweden
Olympic Games
Gold medal – first place	1924 Paris	Team jumping

Axel Reinhold Ståhle (1 February 1891 – 21 November 1987) was a Swedish Army officer and horse rider who competed in the 1924 Summer Olympics. He and his horse Cecil finished seventh in the individual jumping event and won a gold medal with the Swedish jumping team.

Ståhle became ryttmästare in the reserve in 1928.

== Awards and decorations ==
- (Sweden) Knight of the Order of the Sword (1941)
