= Adam Królikiewicz =

Polish equestrian (1894–1966)

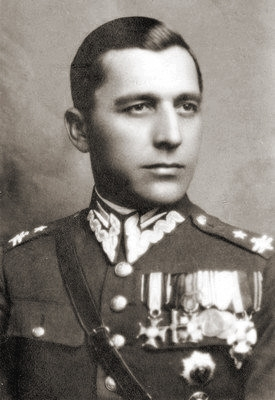

Personal information
- Full name: Adam Łukasz Królikiewicz
- Born: 9 December 1894 Lemberg, Austro-Hungarian Empire (now Lviv, Ukraine)
- Died: 4 May 1966 (aged 71) Konstancin-Jeziorna, Poland
- Height: 170 cm (5 ft 7 in)
- Weight: 65 kg (143 lb)
Medal record
Men's equestrian
Representing Poland
Olympic Games
Bronze medal – third place	1924 Paris	Individual jumping

Adam Łukasz Królikiewicz (9 December 1894 – 4 May 1966) was a Polish horse rider, major of Polish Army, who competed in the 1924 Summer Olympics. He was born in Lviv. He died in Konstancin-Jeziorna. He was a member of Polish Legions and fought in World War I.

In 1924 he and his horse Picador won the bronze medal in the individual jumping competition. As part of the Polish jumping team they finishing sixth in the team jumping competition.

In 1966 he died in an accident, when he fell from a horse during the filming of Andrzej Wajda's film Popioły.

== Honours and awards ==
- Silver Cross of the Order of Virtuti Militari
- Cross of Independence
- Silver Cross of Merit - twice
