= Ragnar Olson =

Swedish horse rider

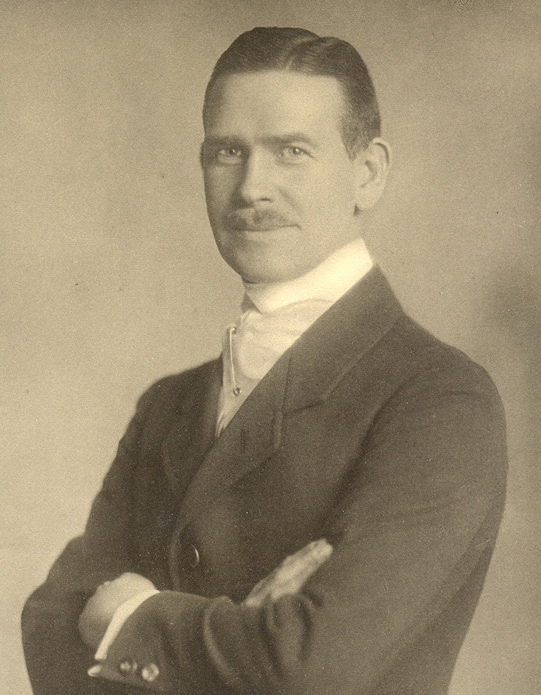

Personal information
- Born: 10 August 1880 Kristianstad, Sweden
- Died: 10 July 1955 (aged 74) Bromma, Sweden

Sport
- Sport: Equestrian
- Club: Stockholms FRK
Medal record
Representing Sweden
Olympic Games
Silver medal – second place	1928 Amsterdam	team dressage
Bronze medal – third place	1928 Amsterdam	individual dressage

Carl Adolf Ragnar Olson (10 August 1880 – 10 July 1955) was a Swedish horse rider who competed in the 1928 Summer Olympics. He won a bronze medal in the individual dressage competition with his horse Günstling, and a silver medal as part of the Swedish dressage team.

Olson lived in Hässleholm in southern Sweden. He became famous for housing, during the winter of 1918–1919, the exiled German army chief Erich Ludendorff, after the German World War I capitulation in 1918.
