= Hermann Linkenbach =

German equestrian

Olympic medal record

Men's Equestrian
Gold medal – first place	1928 Amsterdam	Team dressage

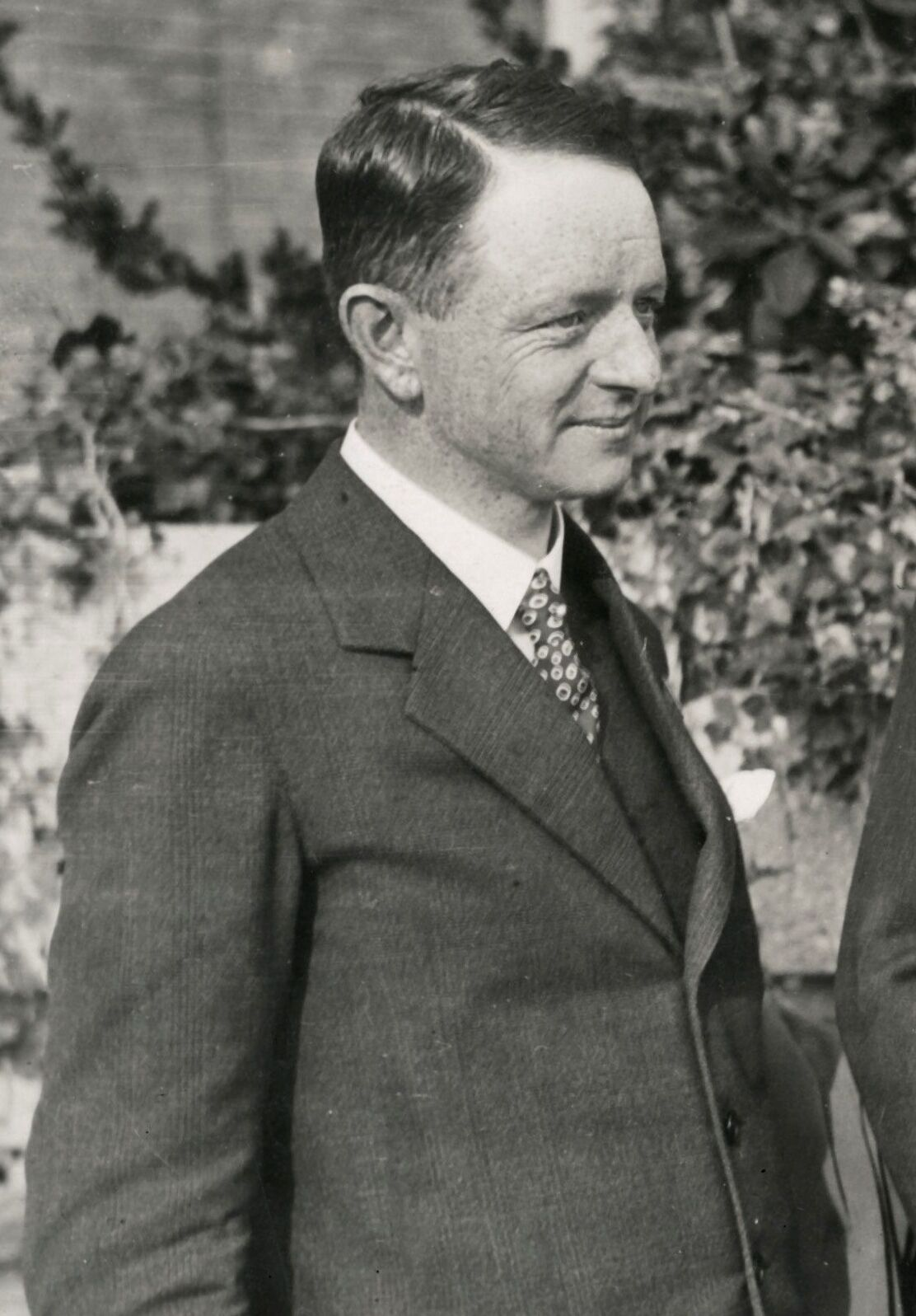
Hermann Linkenbach in 1928

Hermann Linkenbach (8 April 1889 – 29 June 1959) was a German military riding instructor and career army officer. He is best known for competing in the 1928 Summer Olympics and for having surrendered the city of Trieste to the Allies in World War II.

Born in Barmen (now part of Wuppertal), Linkenbach entered the military in 1909. During World War I he served as a Fahnenjunker in various capacities including staff officer and intelligence. After the war he spent time in mounted units and as an instructor at the cavalry school in Hanover; he was an instructor there during the 1928 Olympics. Linkenbach on the horse Gimpel was part of the German dressage team which won the gold medal in the team dressage event after finishing sixth in the individual dressage competition. At age 17, Gimpel was also part of the 1936 German Olympic equestrian team, which again won the team gold. From 1936 to 1943 Linkenbach commanded a military remount school in Großenhain, and in 1941 he was promoted to Generalmajor. In April 1945 he was put in command of Trieste, which he surrendered on 2 May to New Zealander troops. He was imprisoned until June 1947.

Linkenbach attended the 1948 London Olympics and wrote an account of the equestrian events, Olympische Reiterkämpfe London 1948 (Düsseldorf: Sankt Georg Kunstverlag, 1948). Linkenbach died in Stade in 1959.
