= František Ventura =

Czech equestrian

Olympic medal record

Men's Equestrian
Gold medal – first place	1928 Amsterdam	Individual jumping

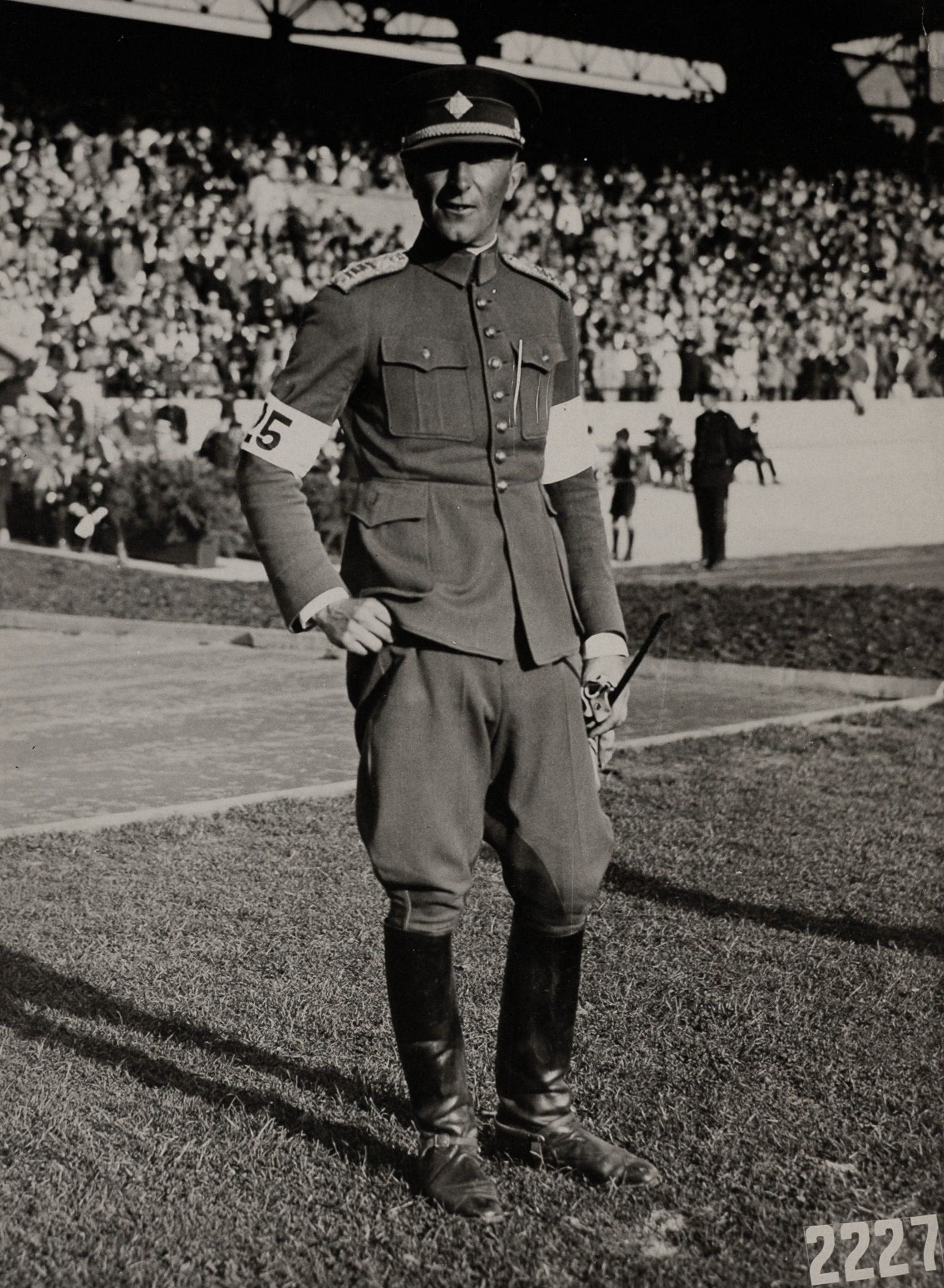
František Ventura

František Ventura (13 August 1894 in Cerekvice nad Loučnou – 1 December 1969 in Prague) was a Czech equestrian who competed in the 1928 Summer Olympics.

In 1928, he and his horse Eliot won the gold medal in the individual jumping competition. The Czechoslovak jumping team did not finish the team jumping competition, because one of their riders was disqualified in the individual competition.
