= Oldřich Buchar =

Czech equestrian (1891–1973)

Personal information
- Nationality: Czech
- Born: 1 June 1891; Heřmanův Městec, Austria-Hungary
- Died: 20 May 1973; Prague, Czechoslovakia

Sport
- Sport: Equestrian

Oldřich Buchar (1 June 1891 – 20 May 1973) was a Czechoslovak equestrian. He competed in two events at the 1924 Summer Olympics.
