= Michał Antoniewicz =

Polish equestrian (1897–1989)

Olympic medal record

Men's Equestrian
Silver medal – second place	1928 Amsterdam	Team jumping
Bronze medal – third place	1928 Amsterdam	Team three-day event

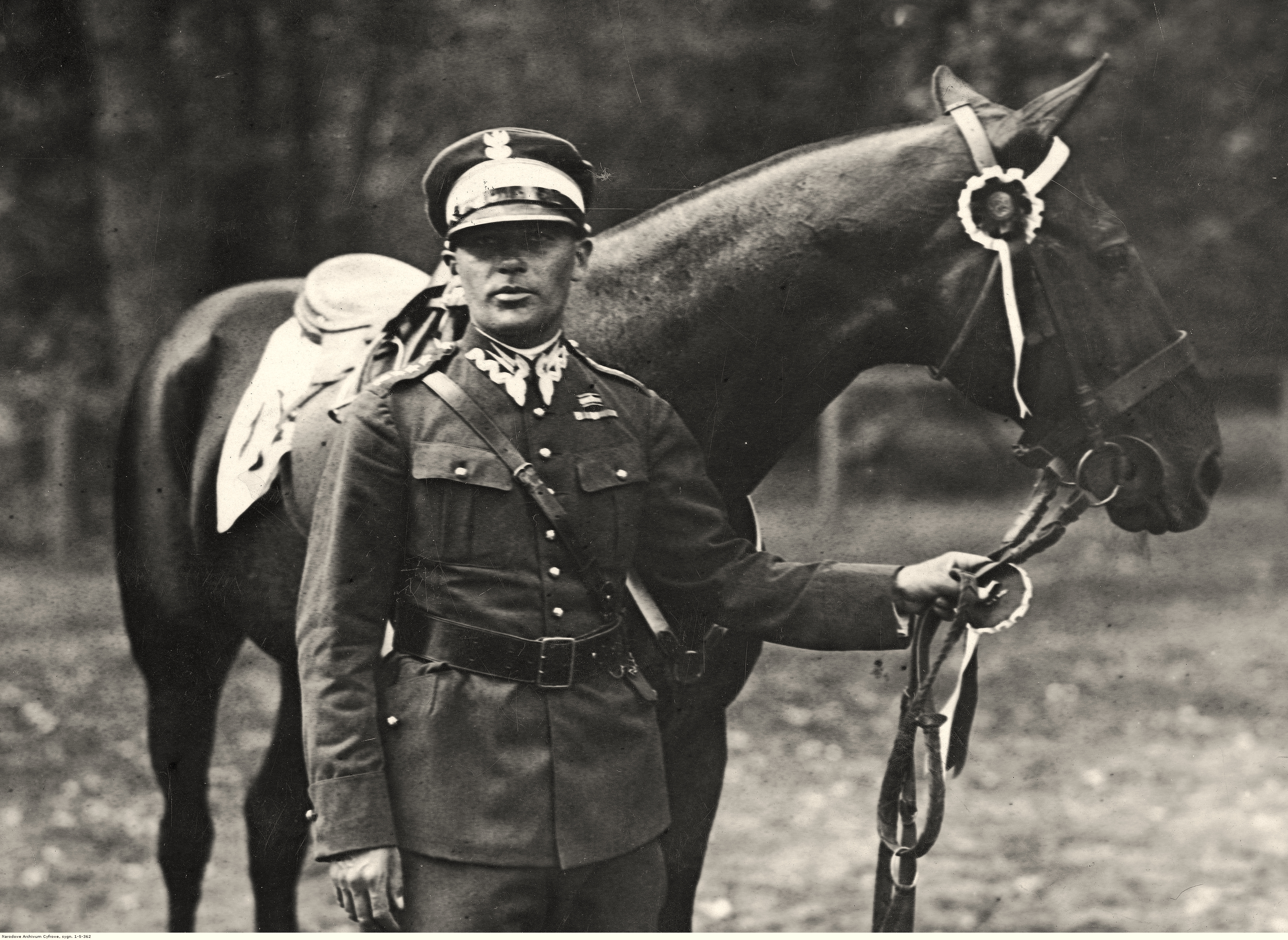
Michał Antoniewicz

Michał Woysym-Antoniewicz (July 7, 1897 – December 1, 1989) was a Polish equestrian who competed in the 1928 Summer Olympics. He was born in Kraków and died in Austin, Texas, United States.

He won the silver medal in the team jumping with his horse Readgleadt. In the individual jumping he finished twentieth.

In the team three-day event he won the bronze medal with his horse Moja Miła after finishing nineteenth in the individual three-day event.
