= Eugen Freiherr von Lotzbeck =

German equestrian

Olympic medal record

Men's Equestrian
Gold medal – first place	1928 Amsterdam	Team dressage

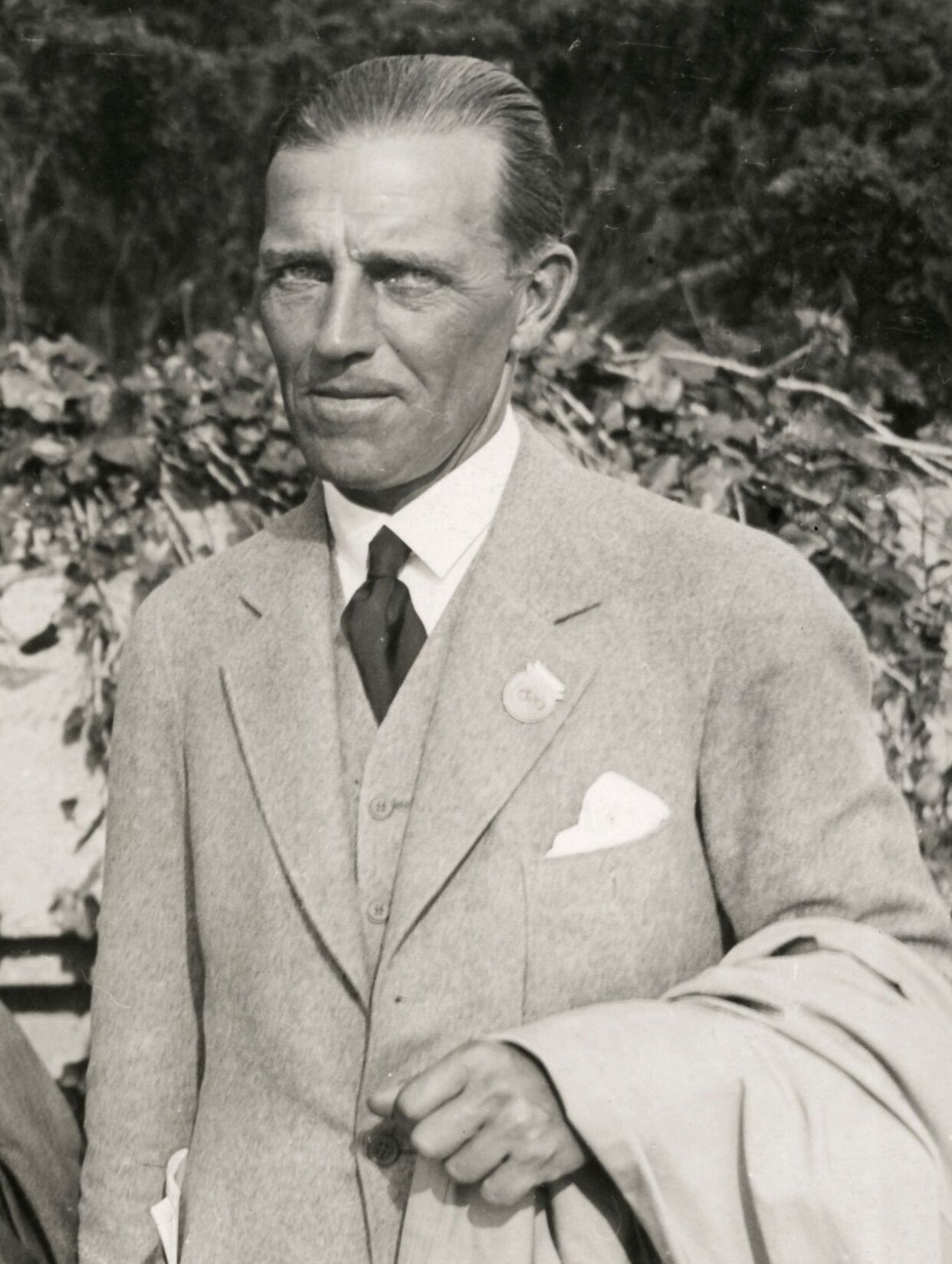
Eugen Freiherr von Lotzbeck in 1928

Eugen Freiherr von Lotzbeck (24 February 1882 in Munich – 22 May 1942 in Assenhausen, Starnberg) was a German horse rider who competed in the 1928 Summer Olympics.

In 1928 he and his horse Caracalla were part of the German dressage team which won the gold medal in the team dressage event after finishing eleventh in the individual dressage competition.
