= Pierre Bertran de Balanda =

French equestrian

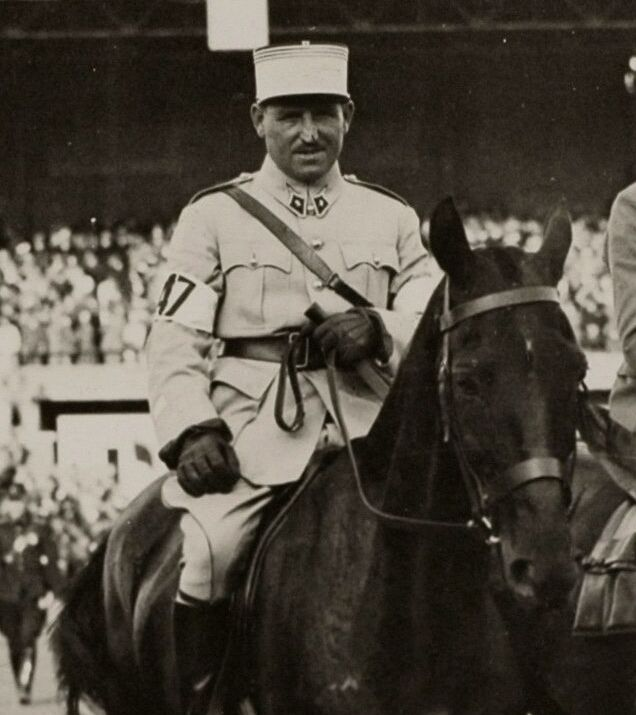

Medal record

Men's Equestrian

Representing France
Silver medal – second place	1928 Amsterdam	Individual jumping

Pierre Louis Marie Bertran de Balanda (28 September 1887 – 28 March 1946) was a French horse rider who competed in the 1928 Summer Olympics.

He was born in Toulouse and died in Marseille.

In 1928, he and his horse Papillon won the silver medal in the individual jumping competition. They also finished fourth as part of the French jumping team in the team jumping competition.
