= Karl Hansen (equestrian) =

Swedish equestrian

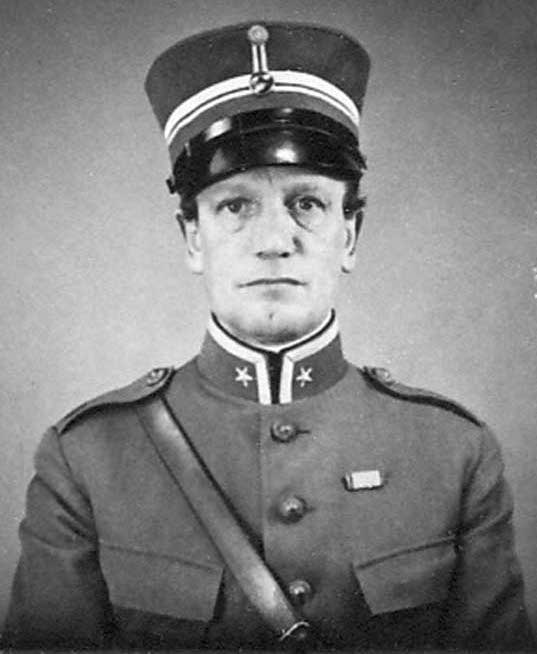

Personal information
- Born: 30 July 1890 Stjärnorp, Linköping, Sweden
- Died: 5 April 1959 (aged 68) Stockholm, Sweden

Sport
- Sport: Horse riding
- Club: A6 IF, Jönköping
Medal record
Representing Sweden
Olympic Games
Bronze medal – third place	1928 Amsterdam	Team jumping

Karl Alfred Hansen (30 July 1890 – 5 April 1959) was a Swedish Army officer horse rider who competed in the 1928 Summer Olympics. He and his horse Gerold finished sixth in the individual jumping and won a bronze medal with the Swedish jumping team.

Hansen was major in the Swedish Army.
