= Bjart Ording =

Norwegian equestrian

Olympic medal record

Men's Equestrian
Silver medal – second place	1928 Amsterdam	Team eventing

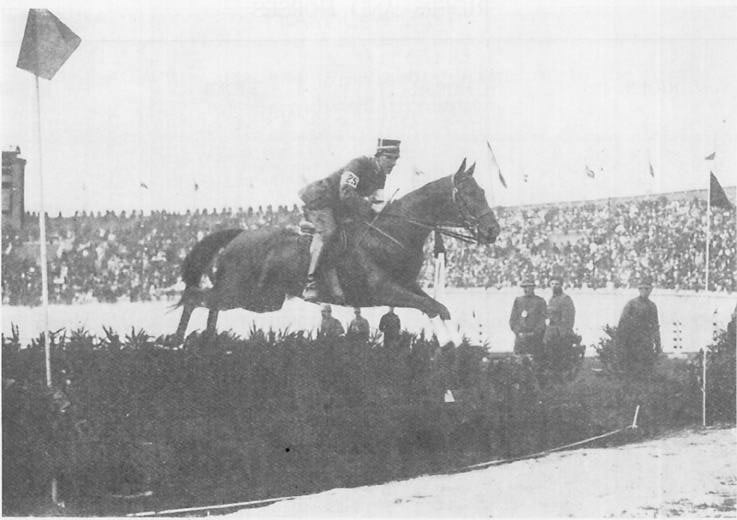
Bjart Ording in 1928

Bjart Ording (19 May 1898 – 12 October 1975) was a Norwegian horse rider who competed in the 1928 Summer Olympics and in the 1952 Summer Olympics.

In 1928 he and his horse And Over won the silver medal as member of the Norwegian eventing team in the team eventing competition after finishing sixth in the individual eventing. He and his horse Fram I finished eleventh as part of the Swiss jumping team in the team jumping competition after finishing 36th in the individual jumping event.

Twenty-four years later at the 1952 Olympics in Helsinki he finished 29th with his horse Fram II in the individual jumping competition.
