= Francisco António Real =

Portuguese sports shooter

Personal information
- Born: 13 October 1885 Lisbon, Portugal
- Died: 14 August 1974 (aged 88)

Sport
- Sport: Sports shooting

Francisco António Real (13 October 1885 – 14 August 1974) was a Portuguese sports shooter. He competed at the 1924, 1932 and the 1936 Summer Olympics.
