= Leone Valle =

Italian equestrian (1885–1944)

Leone Pietro Clemente Valle
Personal information
- Nationality: Italian
- Born: 24 June 1885 Asti, Kingdom of Italy
- Died: 11 May 1944 (aged 58) Turin, German-occupied Italy

Sport
- Sport: Equestrian

Achievements and titles
- Olympic finals: 1924 Summer Olympics

Leone Valle (24 June 1885 – 11 May 1944) was an Italian equestrian. He competed in two events at the 1924 Summer Olympics.
