= António Martins (sport shooter, born 1892) =

Portuguese sports shooter

Personal information
- Nationality: Portuguese
- Born: 4 April 1892 Abrantes, Portugal
- Died: 3 October 1930 (aged 38) Pedrouços, Portugal

Sport
- Sport: Sports shooting

António Martins (4 April 1892 – 3 October 1930) was a Portuguese sports shooter. He competed at the 1920 Summer Olympics and 1924 Summer Olympics. He also competed in the discus throw at the 1924 Summer Olympics. His son of the same name also represented Portugal at the Olympics as a sports shooter.
