= Charles-Gustave Kuhn =

Swiss equestrian

Olympic medal record

Men's Equestrian
Bronze medal – third place	1928 Amsterdam	Individual jumping

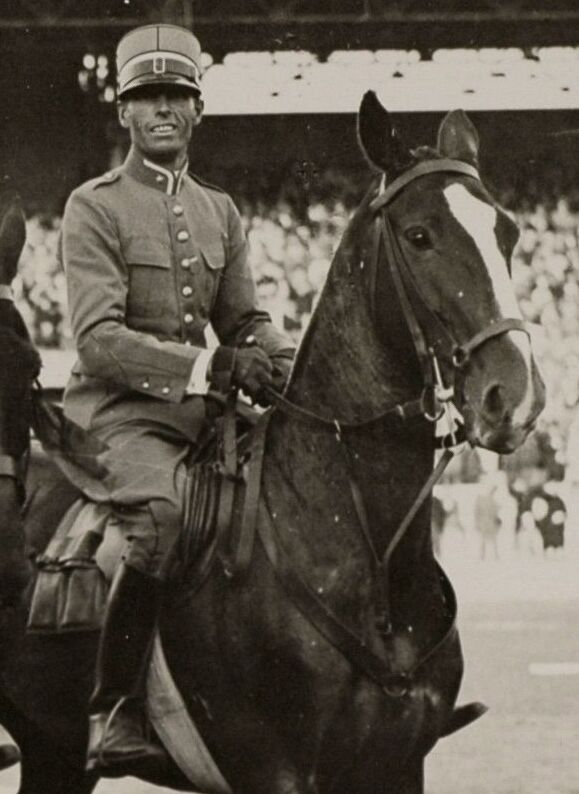
Charles-Gustave Kuhn in 1928

Charles-Gustave Kuhn (28 April 1889 – 18 December 1952) was a Swiss horse rider who competed in the 1928 Summer Olympics.

In 1928 he and his horse Pepita won the bronze medal in the individual jumping competition. They also finished eighth as part of the Swiss jumping team in the team jumping competition.
