= Geoffrey Brooke (equestrian) =

British equestrian

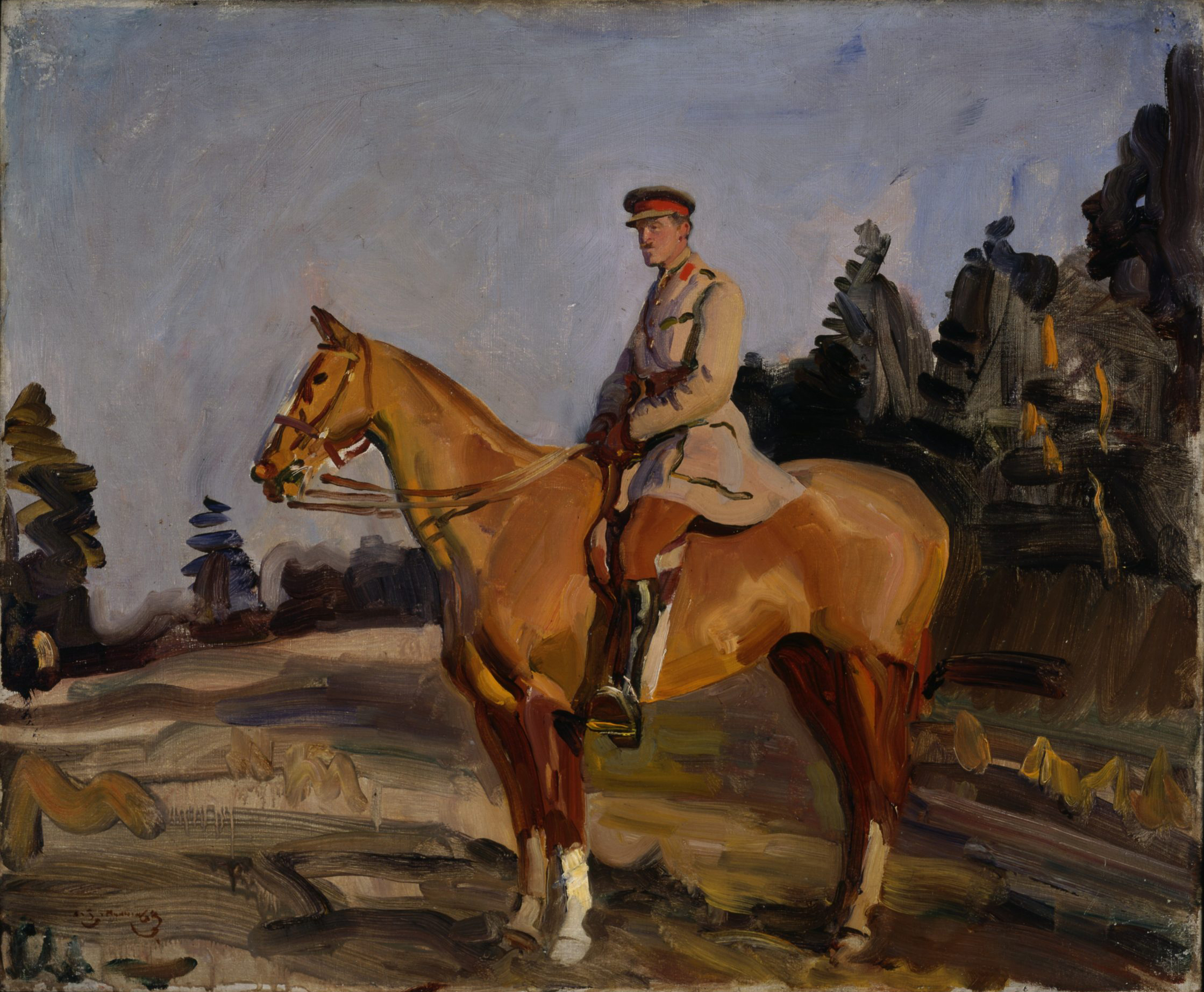
- Brigade Major Geoffrey Brooke DSO (portrait by Munnings)

Personal information
- Nationality: British
- Born: 14 June 1884; Dublin, Ireland
- Died: 26 June 1966 (aged 82); Salisbury, England

Sport
- Sport: Equestrian

Geoffrey Brooke (14 June 1884 – 26 June 1966) was a British equestrian. He competed in two events at the 1924 Summer Olympics.
