= Capel Brunker =

British equestrian

Personal information
- Nationality: British
- Born: 19 December 1898; New Amsterdam, British Guiana
- Died: 25 June 1988 (aged 89); Bourne End, England

Sport
- Sport: Equestrian

Capel Brunker (19 December 1898 – 25 June 1988) was a British equestrian. He competed at the 1924 Summer Olympics and the 1936 Summer Olympics.
