= Zdzisław Dziadulski =

Polish equestrian (1896–1940)

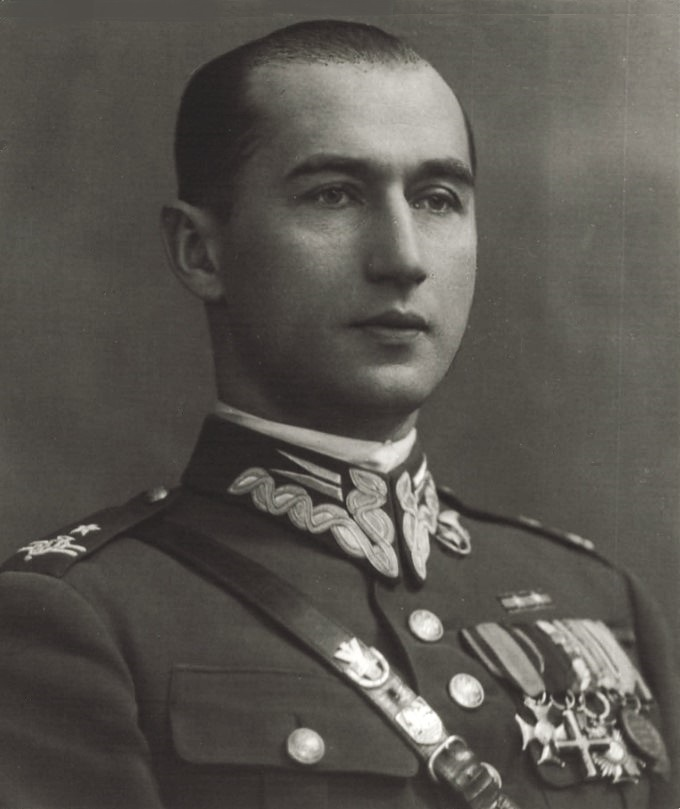

Personal information
- Nationality: Polish
- Born: 5 December 1896 Kraków, Austria-Hungary
- Died: 1940 (aged 43–44) Kharkiv, Ukrainian SSR, Soviet Union

Sport
- Sport: Equestrian

Zdzisław Dziadulski (5 December 1896 – 1940) was a Polish equestrian. He competed in two events at the 1924 Summer Olympics. He was killed during World War II.
