= Michel Bignon =

French equestrian

Personal information
- Nationality: French
- Born: 2 January 1891; Biarritz, France
- Died: 18 September 1926 (aged 35); Tarnos, France

Sport
- Sport: Equestrian

Michel Bignon (2 January 1891 – 18 September 1926) was a French equestrian. He competed in two events at the 1924 Summer Olympics.
