= Carl-Friedrich Freiherr von Langen =

German equestrian

Medal record

Equestrian

Representing Germany

Olympic Games
Gold medal – first place	1928 Amsterdam	Individual dressage
Gold medal – first place	1928 Amsterdam	Team dressage

Carl Friedrich Freiherr von Langen (25 July 1887 – 2 August 1934) was a German landowner, cavalry officer, and equestrian who was a gold medalist at the 1928 Summer Olympics.

== Early life ==
Langen was born in Klein Belitz in the Grand Duchy of Mecklenburg-Schwerin, the son of an aristocratic estate owner and horse breeder. He became a landowner in Parow. He entered the 1st Guards Uhlans of the Imperial German Army and fought in the First World War on the eastern front. He attained the rank of Rittmeister but fell seriously ill in 1914, temporarily resulting in significant paralysis of both legs. He gradually recovered and resumed riding by 1917.

== Equestrian career ==
Langen began a sporting career in horsemanship in 1920. In 1921, he won 26 show jumping competitions, came in second 20 times, and third 44 times. In 1922, Langen competed abroad for the first time in Malmö, Sweden but was unsuccessful. The following year, he won five times in Malmö. In 1924, he competed in Italy, winning a show jumping competition against 102 competitors. At the 1928 Summer Olympics in Amsterdam, the first post-war Olympic games in which Germany participated, Langen and his horse Draufgänger won the gold medal in the individual dressage event as well as in the team dressage competition. He also participated with his horse Falkner in the individual jumping competition and finished 28th. As member of the German jumping team they finished seventh in the team jumping event.

== SA involvement, death and memorialization ==
In the autumn of 1930, Langen became a member of the Sturmabteilung (SA), the paramilitary organization of the Nazi Party, attaining the rank of SA-Sturmbannführer. After the Nazi seizure of power, he campaigned vigorously for the transfer of rural riding and driving clubs to the SA's jurisdiction. He died in Potsdam as a result of internal injuries sustained in a fall on 15 July 1934, during a competition at the Döberitz military training area. After his death, he was lauded by Nazi propaganda as a symbol of the mythical German hero. In 1941, the Nazi government under Reich Propaganda Minister Joseph Goebbels, produced a film based on Langen's life with the title Riding for Germany, which contained nationalist and antisemitic content.

== Sources ==
- Carl-Friedrich Freiherr von Langen: Reiten über Hindernisse, Olms Verlag, (Nachdr. d. Ausg. Kiel, Hannover 1931 u. 1933), reprint 1983, ISBN 3-487-08257-8, (German, autobiography)
- Nele Maya Fahnenbruck: "...reitet für Deutschland": Pferdesport und Politik im Nationalsozialismus. Die Werkstatt, 15. März 2013, ISBN 978-3730700365 (German, dissertation University of Hamburg)
- Langen, Carl-Friedrich Freiherr von – entry at Neue Deutsche Biographie
- Joachim Puttkamer: Mecklenburg-Vorpommern: 100 berühmte Köpfe. Sutton Verlag 2011, ISBN 9783866808515, S. 102 (Auszug (Google), p. 102, at Google Books)
