= Åke Thelning =

Swedish equestrian

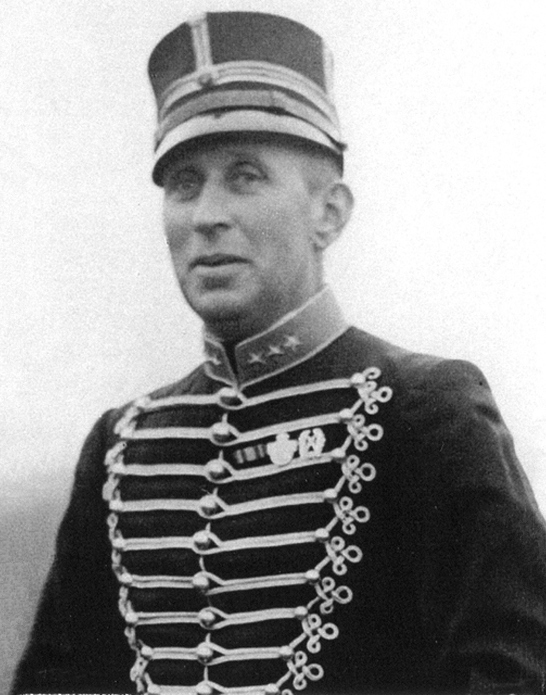

Personal information
- Full name: Hans Berndt Åke Thelning
- Born: 24 October 1892 Södra Härene, Vårgårda, Sweden
- Died: 16 February 1979 (aged 86) Särö, Sweden

Sport
- Sport: Horse riding
- Club: K5 IF, Helsingborg
Medal record
Representing Sweden
Olympic Games
Gold medal – first place	1924 Paris	Team jumping

Hans Berndt Åke Thelning (24 October 1892 – 16 February 1979) was a Swedish Army officer and horse rider who competed in the 1924 Summer Olympics. He and his horse Löke finished sixth in the individual jumping event and won a gold medal with the Swedish jumping team. Later in the 1930 he worked as a senior teacher at a riding school in Copenhagen.

Ståhle became ryttmästare in the reserve in 1928.

== Awards and decorations ==
- (Sweden) Knight of the Order of the Sword (1942)
