= Emilio López (equestrian) =

Spanish equestrian

Personal information
- Nationality: Spanish
- Born: 9 November 1892; Madrid, Spain
- Died: 19 April 1958 (aged 65); Madrid, Spain

Sport
- Sport: Equestrian

Emilio López (9 November 1892 – 19 April 1958) was a Spanish equestrian. He competed in two events at the 1924 Summer Olympics.
