= Jan van Reede =

Dutch equestrian

Olympic medal record

Men's Equestrian
Bronze medal – third place	1928 Amsterdam	Team dressage

Jan Hermannus van Reede (12 January 1878 in Zwolle – 15 November 1956 in The Hague) was a Dutch horse rider who competed in the 1924 Summer Olympics and in the 1928 Summer Olympics. In the 1924 Summer Olympics he finished fourteenth in the individual dressage. Four years later he won the bronze medal in the team dressage with his horse Hans after finishing eighth in the individual dressage.
