= Alphonse Gemuseus =

Swiss equestrian

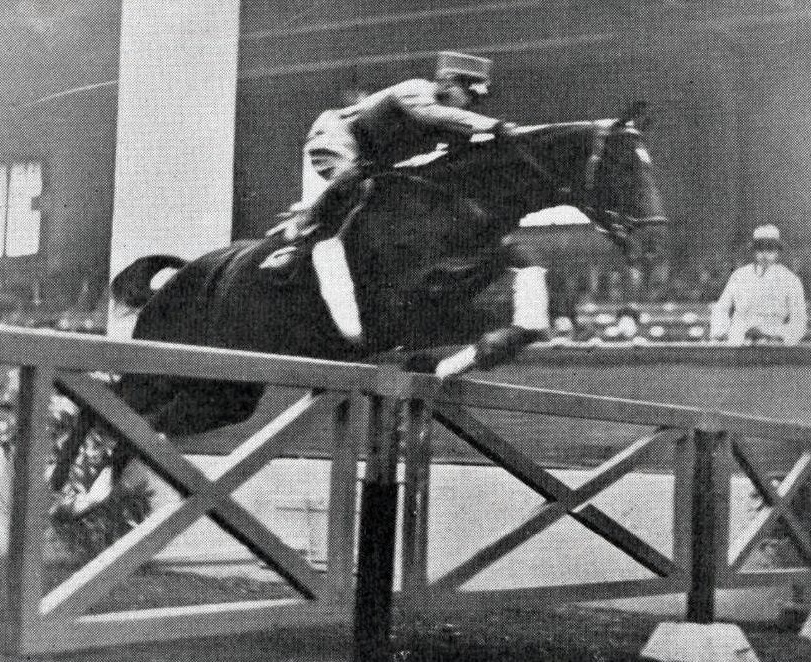
- Alphonse Gemuseus in 1927

Personal information
- Born: 8 May 1898
- Died: 28 January 1981 (aged 82)
Medal record
Men's Equestrian
Representing Switzerland
Olympic Games
Gold medal – first place	1924 Paris	Individual jumping
Silver medal – second place	1924 Paris	Team jumping

Alphonse Gemuseus (8 May 1898 – 28 January 1981) was a Swiss horse rider who competed in the 1924 Summer Olympics and in the 1928 Summer Olympics.

In 1924 he and his horse Lucette won the gold medal in the individual jumping competition. They also won the silver medal as part of the Swiss team in the team jumping competition. Four years later he and Lucette finished eighth as part of the Swiss team in the team jumping competition as well as in the individual jumping event.
