= Adolphe Mercier =

Swiss equestrian

Adolphe Mercier-Breitenstein
Personal information
- Nationality: Swiss
- Born: 10 June 1878
- Died: 2 January 1956 (aged 77)

Sport
- Sport: Equestrian

Adolphe Mercier (10 June 1878 – 2 January 1956) was a Swiss equestrian. He competed at the 1924 Summer Olympics and the 1928 Summer Olympics.
