= António Borges (equestrian) =

Portuguese equestrian (1898–1959)

Olympic medal record

Men's Equestrian
Bronze medal – third place	1924 Paris	Team jumping

António Borges d'Almeida (18 October 1898 – 24 September 1959) was a Portuguese horse rider. He competed in the 1924 Summer Olympics. In 1924, Borges and his horse Reginald won the bronze medal as part of the Portuguese show jumping team, after finishing fifth in the individual jumping competition.
