= Manuel Guerra (sport shooter) =

Portuguese sports shooter

Personal information
- Born: 30 October 1889 Viseu, Portugal

Sport
- Sport: Sports shooting

Manuel Guerra (born 30 October 1889, date of death unknown) was a Portuguese sports shooter. He competed at the 1924 Summer Olympics and the 1932 Summer Olympics.
