= Luís de Meneses (equestrian) =

Portuguese equestrian

Personal information
- Nationality: Portuguese
- Born: 14 July 1902 Santarém, Portugal
- Died: 10 June 1978 (aged 75)

Sport
- Sport: Equestrian
Medal record
Equestrian
Bronze medal – third place	1924 Paris	Team jumping

Luís de Meneses (14 July 1902 – 10 June 1978) was a Portuguese equestrian. He competed in two events at the 1924 Summer Olympics.
