= Henri von der Weid =

Swiss equestrian

Personal information
- Nationality: Swiss
- Born: 12 December 1893; Fribourg, Switzerland
- Died: 24 April 1967 (aged 73); Bern, Switzerland

Sport
- Sport: Equestrian

Henri von der Weid (12 December 1893 – 24 April 1967) was a Swiss equestrian. He competed in three events at the 1924 Summer Olympics.
