= Werner Stuber =

Swiss equestrian

Olympic medal record

Men's Equestrian
Silver medal – second place	1924 Paris	Team jumping

Werner Mortimer Stuber (27 January 1900 – 7 February 1957) was a Swiss horse rider who competed in the 1924 Summer Olympics and in the 1928 Summer Olympics.

In 1924 he and his horse Girandole won the silver medal as part of the Swiss team in the team jumping competition, after finishing 14th in the individual jumping event. He also participated in the individual dressage event and finished twentieth with his horse Queen Mary. Four years later he finished 25th in the individual dressage event with his horse Ulhard.
