= José Mouzinho =

Portuguese equestrian

Olympic medal record

Men's Equestrian
Bronze medal – third place	1924 Paris	Team jumping

José Mouzinho d'Albuquerque (27 December 1885 – 8 August 1965) was a Portuguese horse rider. He competed in the 1924 Summer Olympics and in the 1928 Summer Olympics.

In 1924, Mouzinho and his horse Hetrugo won the bronze medal as part of the Portuguese show jumping team, after finishing 17th in the individual jumping competition. Four years later, he and his horse Hebraico finished sixth as part of the Portuguese show jumping team, after finishing 19th in the individual jumping competition.
