= José Álvarez de Bohórquez =

Spanish equestrian (1895–1993)

The Marquess of Trujillos
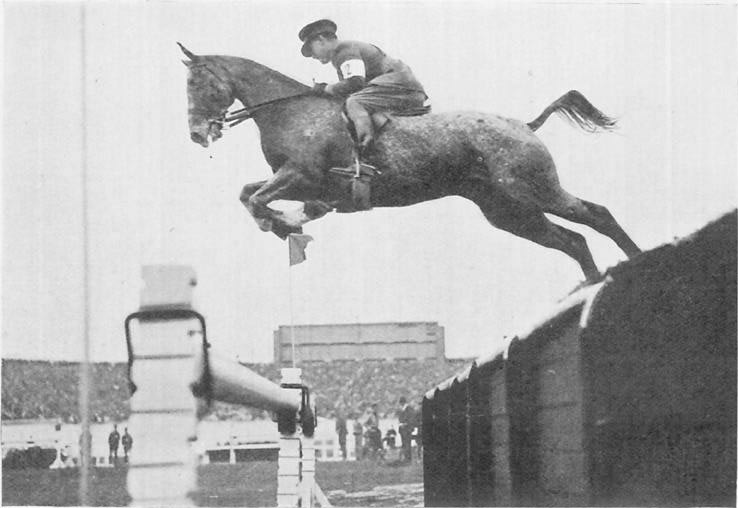

Personal information
- Full name: José María Álvarez de las Asturias Bohorques y Goyeneche
- Born: 23 March 1895; Madrid, Spain
- Died: 27 February 1993 (aged 97); Madrid, Spain
Medal record
Men's equestrian
Representing Spain
Olympic Games
Gold medal – first place	1928 Amsterdam	Team jumping

José Álvarez de las Asturias Bohórquez y Goyeneche, 10th Marquess of Trujillos (23 March 1895 – 27 February 1993) was a Spanish horse rider. Álvarez de Bohórquez competed in the 1924 Summer Olympics and won the team jumping gold medal in the 1928 Summer Olympics. His name is also shortened to José Álvarez de Bohórquez, José Á. de Bohórquez, or José Álvarez.

== Biography ==
José Álvarez de Bohórquez was born on 23 March 1895, in Madrid, Spain.

In the 1924 Summer Olympics in Paris, he finished ninth in the individual jumping and placed eighth as part of the Spanish team in the team jumping with his horse Acabado.

In the 1928 Summer Olympics in Amsterdam he finished tenth in the individual jumping and won the gold medal as part of the Spanish team in the team jumping with his horse Zalamero.

Álvarez de Bohórquez died on 27 February 1993.
