= Gaston Mesmaekers =

Belgian equestrian (1888–1982)

Personal information
- Nationality: Belgian
- Born: 16 October 1888 Turnhout, Belgium
- Died: 3 December 1982 (aged 94) Ostend, Belgium

Sport
- Sport: Equestrian

Gaston Mesmaekers (16 October 1888 – 3 December 1982) was a Belgian equestrian. He competed at the 1924 Summer Olympics and the 1928 Summer Olympics.
