= Pierre Clavé =

French equestrian

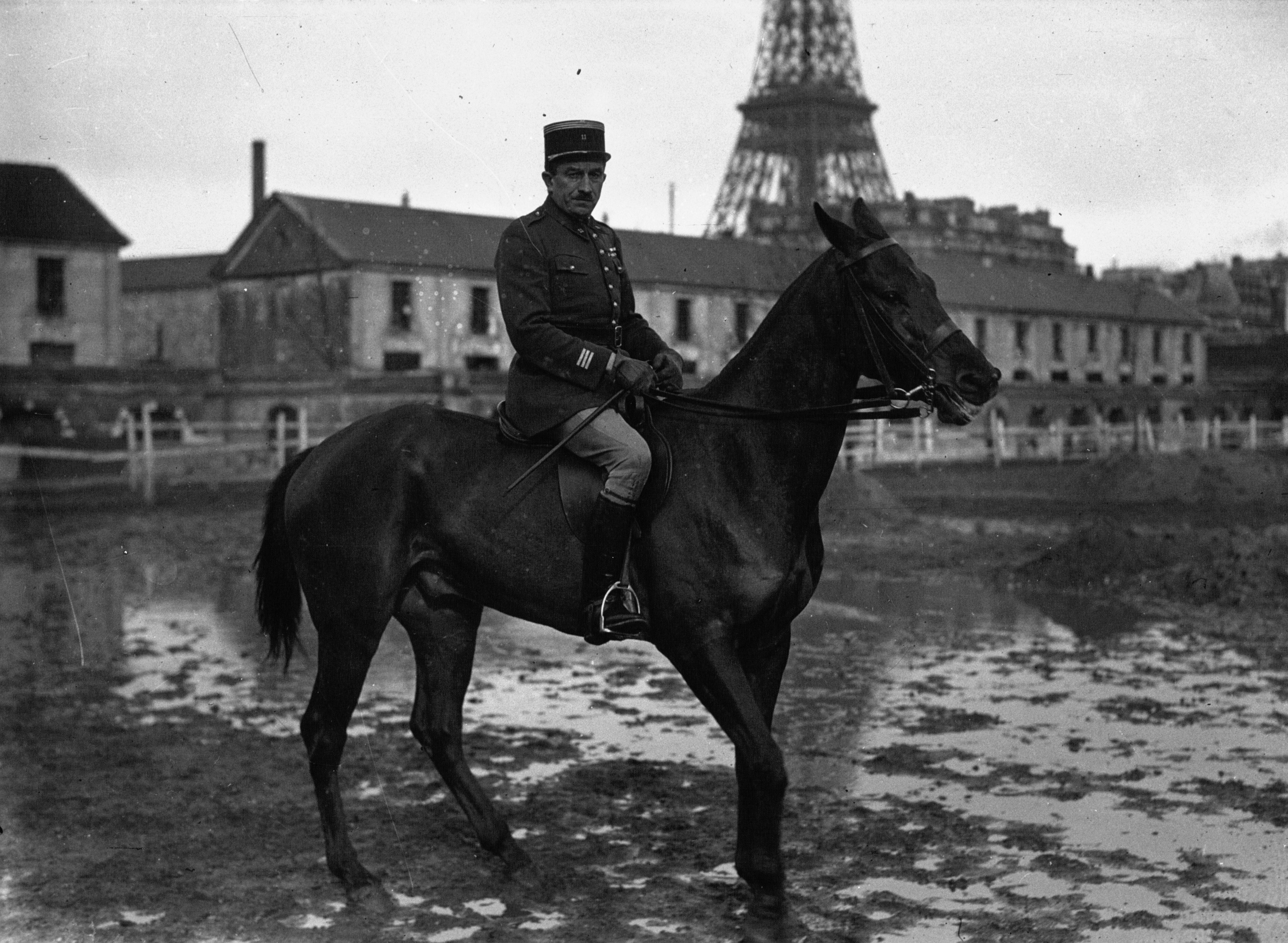
- Pierre Clavé in 1934.

Personal information
- Nationality: French
- Born: 12 July 1887; Sainte-Colombe, France
- Died: 16 July 1974 (aged 87); Sainte-Colombe, France

Sport
- Sport: Equestrian

Pierre Clavé (12 July 1887 – 16 July 1974) was a French cavalry officer and equestrian. He competed at the 1924 Summer Olympics and the 1928 Summer Olympics.
