= José Navarro, Count of Casa Loja =

Spanish equestrian

José Navarro

Personal information
- Full name: José Navarro Morenés
- Born: 8 December 1897; Madrid, Spain
- Died: 13 December 1974 (aged 77); Madrid, Spain
Medal record
Men's equestrian
Representing Spain
Olympic Games
Gold medal – first place	1928 Amsterdam	Team jumping
Silver medal – second place	1948 London	Team jumping

José Navarro Morenés, iure uxoris Count of Casa Loja, (8 December 1897 – 13 December 1974) was a Spanish horse rider who competed in the 1924 Summer Olympics, in the 1928 Summer Olympics, and in the 1948 Summer Olympics. He was born in Madrid.

In the 1924 Summer Olympics he finished 30th in the individual jumping and placed eighth with the Spain team in the team jumping. Four years later he won the gold medal as part of the Spanish team in the team jumping with his horse Zapatazo after finishing fifth in the individual jumping. Twenty years after his first medal, he won the silver medal in the team jumping and finished tenth in the individual jumping.
