= Equestrian events at the 1928 Summer Olympics =

Coordinates: 52.1801°N 5.2296°E

Equestrian at the Games of the IX Olympiad
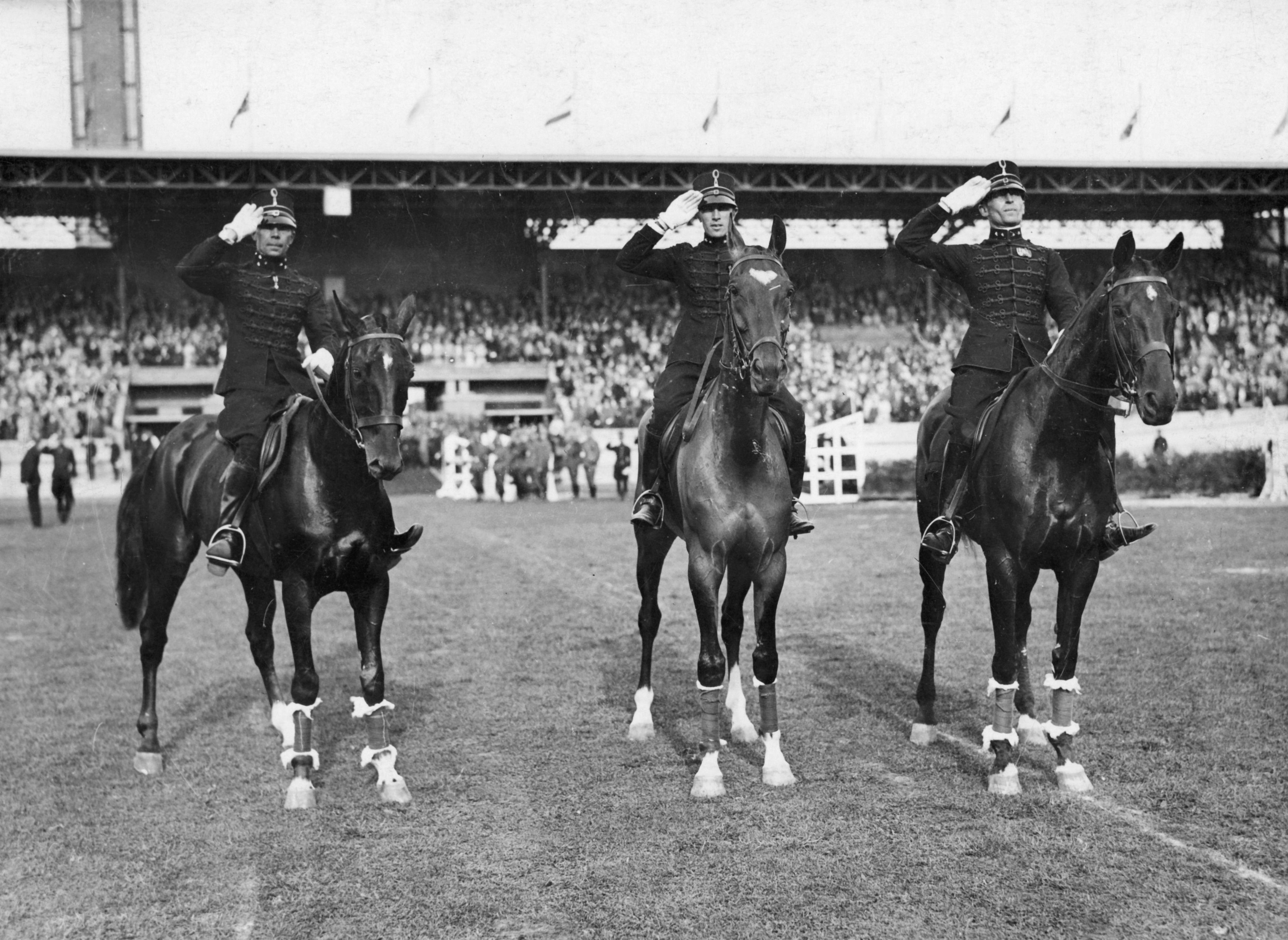
- The Netherlands won the team eventing gold medal and are saluting the audience
- Venue: Hilversum; Olympic Stadium
- Dates: 8–12 August 1928
- No. of events: 6
- Competitors: 113 from 20 nations

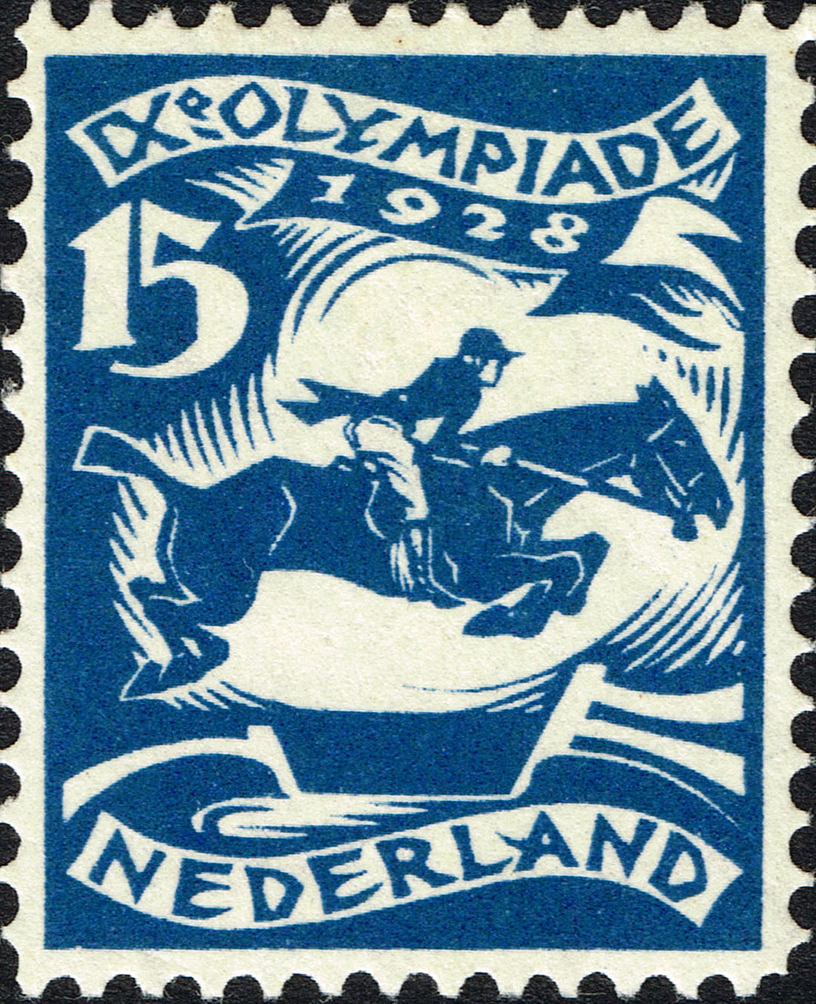
Equestrian at the 1928 Summer Olympics on a stamp of the Netherlands

The equestrian events at the 1928 Summer Olympics included dressage, eventing, and show jumping. All three disciplines had both individual and team competitions. The competitions were held from 8 to 12 August 1928. Teams were now fielded by three riders, rather than four, the purpose being to reduce pressure on national federations to find that many riders in order to compete for team medals. Riders had to be considered amateurs, which was defined as either an actively serving professional officer, or as a gentleman rider as defined by the rules of that rider's national governing body. A total of 113 entries were present from 20 nations: Argentina, Austria, Belgium, Bulgaria, Czechoslovakia, Denmark, Finland, France, Germany, Hungary, Italy, Japan, the Netherlands, Norway, Poland, Portugal, Spain, Sweden, Switzerland, and the USA. This was the first appearance for Hungary, Japan and Argentina in equestrian events at an Olympics. Additionally, after being shut out from two Olympic competitions, Germany also returned to the Games to win a few medals in the equestrian events.

Horses were stabled in Hilversum, a town 30 kilometres (19 mi) from Amsterdam and the location of the majority of the equestrian competition, with two jumping competitions taking place in the Olympic Stadium in Amsterdam. The equestrian competitions produced an income of over 150,000 guilders, out of a total of 1,435,000 guilders income for the entire Games.

== Disciplines ==
=== Jumping ===
46 riders competed from 16 different nations, including Olympic medalist (1920 gold and 1924 silver) Tommaso Lequio di Assaba on Trebecco, who finished 24th, and Alphonse Gemuseus, the 1924 Games gold medalists, finishing 8th on Lucette after garnering 2 time penalties. Seven riders went clear over the 720 meter, 16-obstacle course, whose obstacles ranged in height from 1.25–1.40 meters, and was considered too easy for an Olympic Games. Three riders went clear in the jump-off, so a second jump-off was held with the obstacles raised to 1.60 meters in height. Gold was given to the one clear round, Capt. Ventura of Czechoslovakia on Eliot. The other two riders had one rail apiece over the second jump-off course, but Pierre Bertran de Balanda's mount Papillon hit the rail with his hind legs garnering only 2 penalties, while Major Kuhn's mount Pepita hit a fence with her front legs, counting as 4 penalty points and thus finishing in bronze-medal position.

=== Dressage ===
29 riders from 12 countries competed in the dressage competition. The test was the same as for the 1924 Olympics, but the 10-minute limit was now raised to 13 minutes, giving the riders much needed time to complete it without losing points for going over the time allowed. Judging created controversy, both due to nationalistic tendencies by judges and the fact that individual judges had differing opinions on what was correct. While there was discussion on how to make it more fair—including dropping the lowest and highest scores, only having one judge from a neutral county, and removing 20 points from each score given to a countryman of each judge—no changes were made until after the judging scandal at the 1956 Games.

=== Eventing ===
46 riders from 17 nations competed in the eventing competition. Dressage saw the time allowed for the test raised from 10 to 11 minutes, and was now counting for 300 total points rather than 200 seen in the last Games, making it have a huge impact on final placings, since the time allowed for all phases of the Endurance was generous. There were 8 eliminations on endurance day (resulting in only 3 of the teams finishing the competition) primarily due to missing flags which were difficult to follow over the flat land. The point system for the Endurance day was kept the same (Phases A, C, and E were each worth 200 points, steeplechase was worth 500 points, and cross-country 700 points), while the show jumping phase was reduced in importance from 400 to 300 points total. The speed on steeplechase was raised from 550 up to 600 meters a minute.

== Medal summary ==
Games	Gold	Silver	Bronze
Individual dressage	Carl Freiherr von Langen on Draufgänger; Germany	Charles Marion on Linon; France	Ragnar Olson on Günstling; Sweden
Team dressage	Germany; Carl Freiherr von Langen on Draufgänger; Hermann Linkenbach on Gimpel; Eugen Freiherr von Lotzbeck on Caracalla	Sweden; Ragnar Olson on Günstling; Janne Lundblad on Blackmar; Carl Bonde on Ingo	Netherlands; Jan van Reede on Hans; Pierre Versteegh on His Excellence; Gerard le Heux on Valérine
Individual eventing	Charles Pahud de Mortanges on Marcroix; Netherlands	Gerard de Kruijff on Va-T'en; Netherlands	Bruno Neumann on Ilja; Germany
Team eventing	Netherlands; Charles Pahud de Mortanges on Marcroix; Gerard de Kruijff on Va-T'en; Adolph van der Voort van Zijp on Silver Piece	Norway; Bjart Ording on And Over; Arthur Qvist on Hidalgo; Eugen Johansen on Baby	Poland; Michał Antoniewicz on Moja Miła; Józef Trenkwald on Lwi Pazur; Karol Rómmel on Doneuse
Individual jumping	František Ventura and Eliot; Czechoslovakia	Pierre Bertran de Balanda and Papillon; France	Charles-Gustave Kuhn and Pepita; Switzerland
Team jumping	Spain; Count of Casa Loja and Zapatazo; Marquess of Trujillos and Zalamero; Julio García Fernández de los Ríos and Revistade	Poland; Kazimierz Gzowski and Mylord; Kazimierz Szosland and Ali; Michał Antoniewicz and Readgleadt	Sweden; Karl Hansen and Gerold; Carl Björnstjerna and Kornett; Ernst Hallberg and Loke

== Participating nations ==
A total of 113 horse riders from 20 nations competed at the Amsterdam Games:

- Argentina (3)
- Austria (3)
- Belgium (9)
- Bulgaria (3)
- Czechoslovakia (9)
- Denmark (3)
- Finland (1)
- France (9)
- Germany (8)
- Hungary (5)
- Italy (5)
- Japan (4)
- Netherlands (8)
- Norway (6)
- Poland (5)
- Portugal (3)
- Spain (6)
- Sweden (9)
- Switzerland (9)
- United States (5)

== Medal table ==
Rank	Nation	Gold	Silver	Bronze	Total
1	Netherlands	2	1	1	4
2	Germany	2	0	1	3
3	Czechoslovakia	1	0	0	1
3	Spain	1	0	0	1
5	France	0	2	0	2
6	Sweden	0	1	2	3
7	Poland	0	1	1	2
8	Norway	0	1	0	1
9	Switzerland	0	0	1	1
Totals (9 entries)		6	6	6	18

== Officials ==
Appointment of officials was as follows:

Dressage

- (Netherlands) Col. H. van Reigersberg (Ground Jury President)
- (Sweden) N. Bonde (Ground Jury Member)
- (Belgium) Baron Gaston de Trannoy (Ground Jury Member)
- (Germany) Max von Holzing Berstett (Ground Jury Member)
- (France) Col. E. Wattel (Ground Jury Member)

Jumping

- (Netherlands) Jhr. Karel F. Quarles van Ufford (Ground Jury President)
- (Spain) B. Sanchez Mesas (Ground Jury Member)
- (Czechoslovakia) J. Eminger (Ground Jury Member)
- (Poland) Wladyslaw Anders (Ground Jury Member)
- (Italy) Francesco Amalfi (Ground Jury Member)

Eventing

- (Netherlands) Jhr. Karel F. Quarles van Ufford (Ground Jury President)
- (France) Col. P.E. Haentjens (Ground Jury Member)
- (Hungary) Gabor Vitez Ujfalussy (Ground Jury Member)
- (Switzerland) Col. Guillaume Favre (Ground Jury Member)
- (Norway) Capt. Harald Houge (Ground Jury Member)
