= List of Olympic medalists in equestrian events =

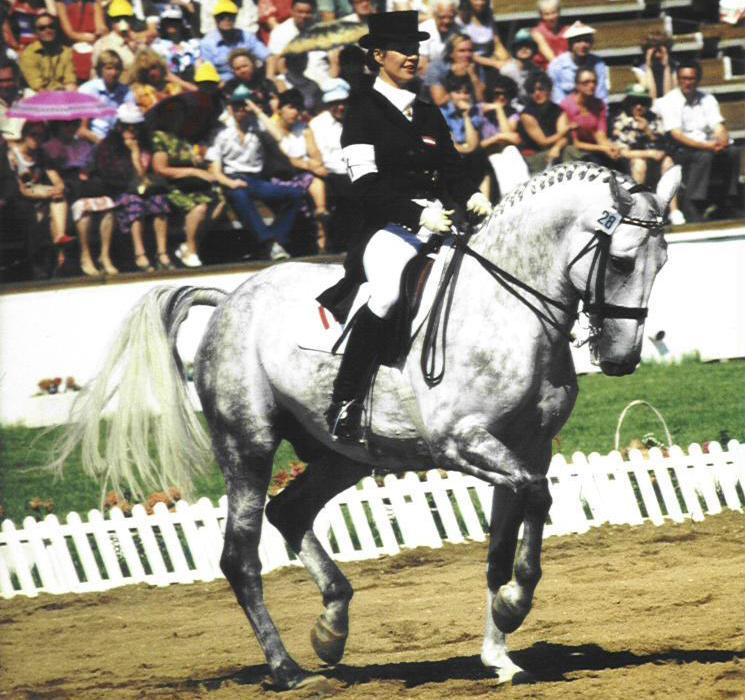
Dressage at the 1980 Summer Olympics

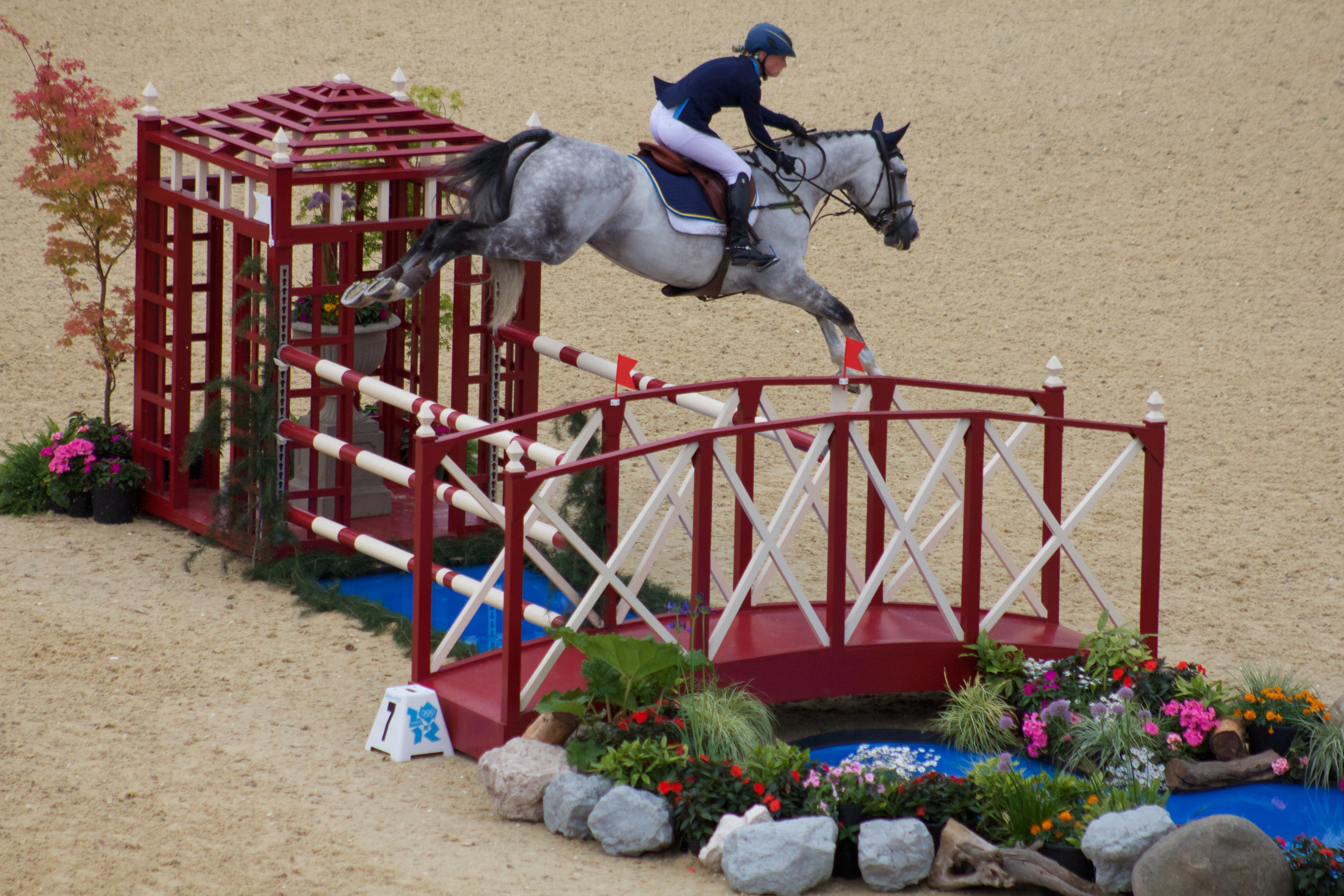
Show jumping at the 2012 Summer Olympics

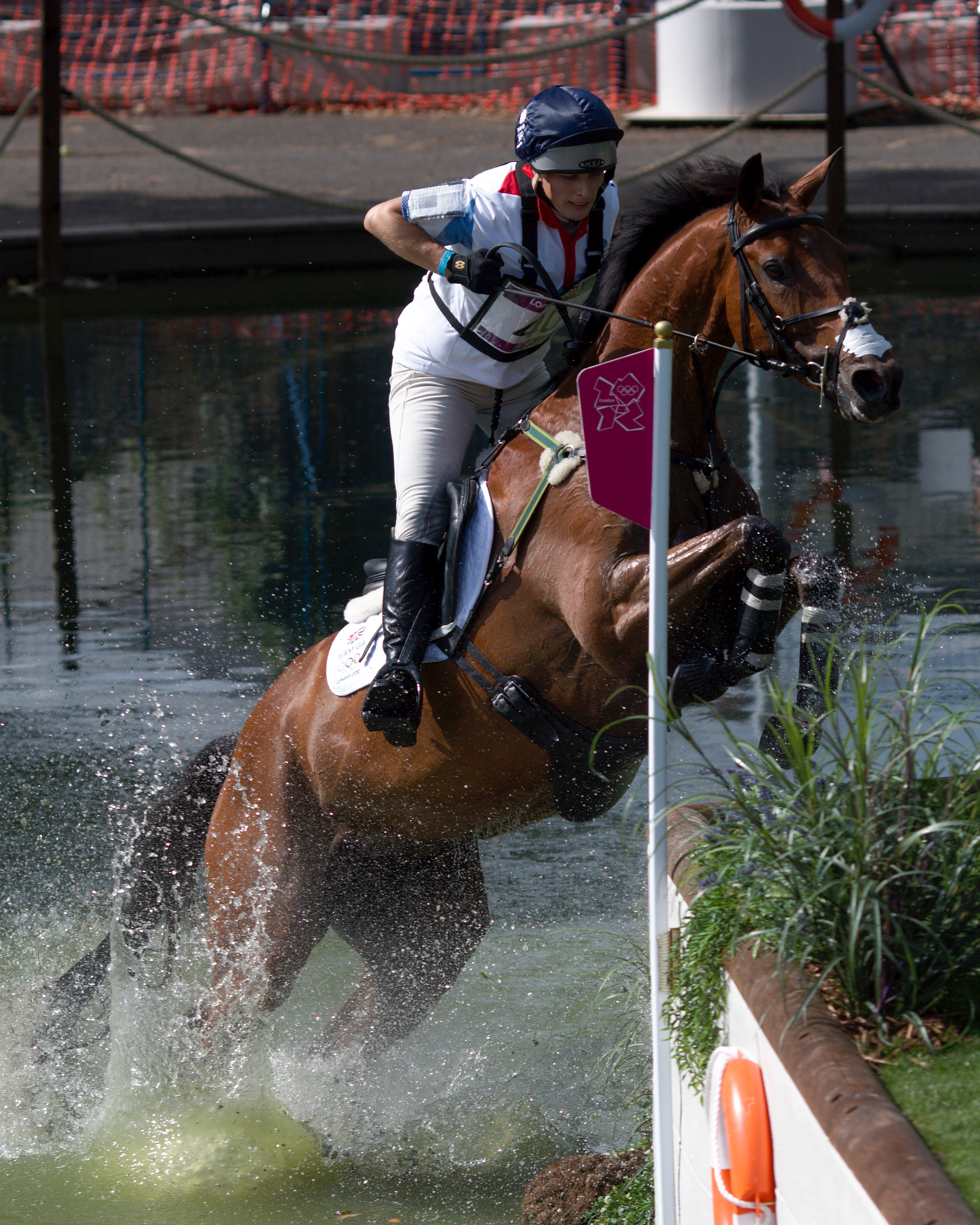
An eventer jumps out of a water obstacle at the 2012 Summer Olympics

Equestrian sports are among those contested at the Summer Olympic Games. Equine events began at the Olympics in 1900, when competitions in polo (considered by the International Olympic Committee (IOC) to be a separate sport from the other equestrian events), vaulting, four-in-hand driving, mail coach driving, mixed hacks and hunters and three types of jumping (high jump, long jump and show-jumping) were held. Most of these events were later discontinued, although equestrian events have continued through the 2016 Summer Olympics, and now include team and individual dressage, three-day eventing and show-jumping. Competitors in the modern pentathlon event also have to complete an equestrian show-jumping course, but this is not part of the equestrian events.

Modern-day Olympic equestrian events are rooted in cavalry skills and classical horsemanship, and through 1948, competition was restricted to active-duty officers on military horses. Only after 1952, as mechanization of warfare reduced the number of military riders, were civilian riders allowed to compete. Equestrian is the only Olympic sport in which animals compete with humans, and is one of four sports in which the genders compete against each other, the others being some sailing divisions, mixed doubles division in tennis and the mixed doubles division of badminton. The rules for Olympic equestrian competition are set by the Fédération Équestre Internationale, the international governing body for equestrian sports.

In two instances, the equestrian portion of the Olympics has been held in a different location from the rest of the games. The first was during the 1956 Summer Olympics in Melbourne, Australia when, due to Australian quarantine laws, the equestrian portion was held in Stockholm, Sweden. At the next IOC meeting, it was decided to hold a special Equestrian Olympic Games several months before the actual Olympics, complete with its own opening and closing ceremonies. This meant that Switzerland, which had officially boycotted the 1956 Games because of the Soviet Union's recent invasion of Hungary, still brought home a medal because of its participation in the equestrian portion several months earlier. The second instance was during the 2008 Summer Olympics, when the equestrian events were held in Hong Kong rather than Beijing. This decision was made when, in 2005, international veterinary groups refused to certify the main Olympic city as free of equine diseases. This would have resulted in horses leaving Beijing after the games and having to go through lengthy quarantine processes before being allowed to re-enter their home countries. Hong Kong also had the benefit of having better facilities, including a top equine hospital and one of only a few equine drug-testing labs in the world.

The Summer Olympics have included 2,129 equestrian participants, including 1,751 men and 378 women, from 69 countries. (Note: This number is approximate, because the number of competitors in early games is uncertain in many cases.), of which 564 won a medal. As of the 2008 Olympics, 395 medals have been awarded to 31 NOCs. The oldest rider was 72-year-old Arthur von Pongracz of Austria at the 1936 Summer Olympics, while the youngest was 16-year-old Luiza Almeida of Brazil at the 2008 Summer Olympics. The leading medalist is Isabell Werth of Germany (10, 6 gold), followed by Anky van Grunsven of the Netherlands (9, 3 gold) and Reiner Klimke of Germany (8, 6 gold). Germany leads the country medalist rankings with 25 gold medals (52 overall), (Note: Includes only the medals won by Germany as a whole country; medals won by the United Team of Germany (EUA) and the Federal Republic of Germany (West Germany) are not included. The IOC considers these three separate National Olympic Committees and lists their results as such, but another major database combines Germany and the EUA, while leaving the FRG separate.) followed by Sweden with 17 (43 overall) and France with 14 (37 overall). Canadian rider Ian Millar holds the record for the most Olympic equestrian appearances and matches the record for athletes in any sport, having competed in ten Olympics as of 2012.

== Dressage ==
=== Dressage, individual ===
Games	Gold	Silver	Bronze
1912 Stockholm	Carl Bonde on Emperor; Sweden	Gustaf Adolf Boltenstern on Neptun; Sweden	Hans von Blixen-Finecke on Maggie; Sweden
1920 Antwerp	Janne Lundblad on Uno; Sweden	Bertil Sandström on Sabel; Sweden	Hans von Rosen on Running Sister; Sweden
1924 Paris	Ernst Linder on Piccolomino; Sweden	Bertil Sandström on Sabel; Sweden	Xavier Lesage on Plumard; France
1928 Amsterdam	Carl Freiherr von Langen on Draufgänger; Germany	Charles Marion on Linon; France	Ragnar Olson on Günstling; Sweden
1932 Los Angeles	Xavier Lesage on Taine; France	Charles Marion on Linon; France	Hiram Tuttle on Olympic; United States
1936 Berlin	Heinz Pollay on Kronos; Germany	Friedrich Gerhard on Absinth; Germany	Alois Podhajsky on Nero; Austria
1948 London	Hans Moser on Hummer; Switzerland	André Jousseaume on Harpagon; France	Gustaf Adolf Boltenstern Jr. on Trumf; Sweden
1952 Helsinki	Henri Saint Cyr on Master Rufus; Sweden	Lis Hartel on Jubilee; Denmark	André Jousseaume on Harpagon; France
1956 Stockholm	Henri Saint Cyr on Juli; Sweden	Lis Hartel on Jubilee; Denmark	Liselott Linsenhoff on Adular; United Team of Germany
1960 Rome	Sergei Filatov on Absent; Soviet Union	Gustav Fischer on Wald; Switzerland	Josef Neckermann on Asbach; United Team of Germany
1964 Tokyo	Henri Chammartin on Wörmann; Switzerland	Harry Boldt on Remus; United Team of Germany	Sergei Filatov on Absent; Soviet Union
1968 Mexico City	Ivan Kizimov on Ikhor; Soviet Union	Josef Neckermann on Mariano; West Germany	Reiner Klimke on Dux; West Germany
1972 Munich	Liselott Linsenhoff on Piaff; West Germany	Yelena Petushkova on Pepel; Soviet Union	Josef Neckermann on Venetia; West Germany
1976 Montreal	Christine Stückelberger on Granat; Switzerland	Harry Boldt on Woycek; West Germany	Reiner Klimke on Mehmed; West Germany
1980 Moscow	Elisabeth Theurer on Mon Cherie; Austria	Yuri Kovshov on Igrok; Soviet Union	Viktor Ugryumov on Shkval; Soviet Union
1984 Los Angeles	Reiner Klimke on Ahlerich; West Germany	Anne Grethe Jensen on Marzog; Denmark	Otto Hofer on Limandus; Switzerland
1988 Seoul	Nicole Uphoff on Rembrandt; West Germany	Margit Otto-Crépin on Corlandus; France	Christine Stückelberger on Gauguin de Lully CH; Switzerland
1992 Barcelona	Nicole Uphoff on Rembrandt; Germany	Isabell Werth on Gigolo; Germany	Klaus Balkenhol on Goldstern; Germany
1996 Atlanta	Isabell Werth on Gigolo; Germany	Anky van Grunsven on Bonfire; Netherlands	Sven Rothenberger on Weyden; Netherlands
2000 Sydney	Anky van Grunsven on Bonfire; Netherlands	Isabell Werth on Gigolo; Germany	Ulla Salzgeber on Rusty; Germany
2004 Athens	Anky van Grunsven on Salinero; Netherlands	Ulla Salzgeber on Rusty; Germany	Beatriz Ferrer-Salat on Beauvalais; Spain
2008 Beijing	Anky van Grunsven on Salinero; Netherlands	Isabell Werth on Satchmo; Germany	Heike Kemmer on Bonaparte; Germany
2012 London	Charlotte Dujardin on Valegro; Great Britain	Adelinde Cornelissen on Parzival; Netherlands	Laura Bechtolsheimer on Mistral Højris; Great Britain
2016 Rio de Janeiro	Charlotte Dujardin on Valegro; Great Britain	Isabell Werth on Weihegold; Germany	Kristina Bröring-Sprehe on Desperados; Germany
2020 Tokyo	Jessica von Bredow-Werndl on Dalera; Germany	Isabell Werth on Bella Rose; Germany	Charlotte Dujardin on Gio; Great Britain
2024 Paris	Jessica von Bredow-Werndl on Dalera; Germany	Isabell Werth on Wendy; Germany	Charlotte Fry on Glamourdale; Great Britain
2028 Los Angeles			

=== Dressage, team ===
Games	Gold	Silver	Bronze
1928 Amsterdam	Germany; Carl Freiherr von Langen on Draufgänger; Hermann Linkenbach on Gimpel; Eugen Freiherr von Lotzbeck on Caracalla	Sweden; Ragnar Olson on Günstling; Janne Lundblad on Blackmar; Carl Bonde on Ingo	Netherlands; Jan van Reede on Hans; Pierre Versteegh on His Excellence; Gerard le Heux on Valérine
1932 Los Angeles	France; Xavier Lesage on Taine; Charles Marion on Linon; André Jousseaume on Sorelta	Sweden; Bertil Sandström on Kreta; Thomas Byström on Gulliver; Gustaf Adolf Boltenstern Jr. on Ingo	United States; Hiram Tuttle on Olympic; Isaac Kitts on American Lady; Alvin Moore on Water Pat
1936 Berlin	Germany; Heinz Pollay on Kronos; Friedrich Gerhard on Absinth; Hermann von Oppeln-Bronikowski on Gimpel	France; André Jousseaume on Favorite; Gérard de Ballorre on Debaucheur; Daniel Gillois on Nicolas	Sweden; Gregor Adlercreutz on Teresina; Sven Colliander on Kål XX; Folke Sandström on Pergola
1948 London	France; André Jousseaume on Harpagon; Jean Saint-Fort Paillard on Sous les Ceps; Maurice Buret on Saint Quen	United States; Robert Borg on Klingson; Earl Foster Thomson on Pancraft; Frank Henry on Reno Overdo	Portugal; Fernando Paes on Matamas; Francisco Valadas on Feitiço; Luís Mena e Silva on Fascinante
1952 Helsinki	Sweden; Henri Saint Cyr on Master Rufus; Gustaf Adolf Boltenstern Jr. on Krest; Gehnäll Persson on Knaust	Switzerland; Gottfried Trachsel on Kursus; Henri Chammartin on Wöhler; Gustav Fischer on Soliman	Germany; Heinz Pollay on Adular; Ida von Nagel on Afrika; Fritz Thiedemann on Chronist
1956 Stockholm	Sweden; Henri Saint Cyr on Juli; Gehnäll Persson on Knaust; Gustaf Adolf Boltenstern Jr. on Krest	United Team of Germany; Liselott Linsenhoff on Adular; Hannelore Weygand on Perkunos; Anneliese Küppers on Afrika	Switzerland; Gottfried Trachsel on Kursus; Henri Chammartin on Wöhler; Gustav Fischer on Vasello
1960 Rome	not included in the Olympic program		
1964 Tokyo	United Team of Germany; Harry Boldt on Remus; Reiner Klimke on Dux; Josef Neckermann on Antoinette	Switzerland; Henri Chammartin on Wörmann; Gustav Fischer on Wald; Marianne Gossweiler on Stephan	Soviet Union; Sergei Filatov on Absent; Ivan Kizimov on Ikhor; Ivan Kalita on Moar
1968 Mexico City	West Germany; Josef Neckermann and Mariano; Reiner Klimke and Dux; Liselott Linsenhoff and Piaff	Soviet Union; Yelena Petushkova and Pepel; Ivan Kizimov and Ikhor; Ivan Kalita and Absent	Switzerland; Henri Chammartin and Wolfdietrich; Marianne Gossweiler and Stephan; Gustav Fischer and Wald
1972 Munich	Soviet Union; Yelena Petushkova and Pepel; Ivan Kizimov and Ikhor; Ivan Kalita and Tarif	West Germany; Karin Schlüter-Schmidt and Liostro; Liselott Linsenhoff and Piaff; Josef Neckermann and Venetia	Sweden; Ulla Håkansson and Ajax; Ninna Swaab and Casanova; Maud von Rosen and Lucky Boy
1976 Montreal	West Germany; Harry Boldt and Woycek; Reiner Klimke and Mehmed; Gabriela Grillo and Ultimo	Switzerland; Christine Stückelberger and Granat; Ulrich Lehmann and Widin; Doris Ramseier and Roch	United States; Hilda Gurney and Keen; Dorothy Morkis and Monaco; Edith Master and Dahlwitz
1980 Moscow	Soviet Union; Yuri Kovshov and Igrok; Viktor Ugryumov and Shkfval; Vira Misevych and Plot	Bulgaria; Petar Mandajiev and Stchibor; Svetoslav lvanov and Aleko; Gheorghi Gadjev and Vnimatelen	Romania; Anghelache Donescu and Dor; Dumitru Veliku and Decebal; Petre Rosca and Derbist
1984 Los Angeles	West Germany; Reiner Klimke and Ahlerich; Uwe Sauer and Montevideo; Herbert Krug and Muscadeur	Switzerland; Otto Hofer and Limandus; Christine Stückelberger and Tansanit; Amy De Bary and Aintree	Sweden; Ulla Hakansson and Flamingo; Louise Nathorst and Inferno; Ingamay Bylund and Aleks
1988 Seoul	West Germany; Reiner Klimke and Ahlerich; Ann-Kathrin Linsenhoff and Courage; Monica Theodorescu and Ganimedes; Nicole Uphoff and Rembrandt	Switzerland; Otto Josef Hofer and Andiamo; Christine Stückelberger and Gauguin de Lully CH; Daniel Ramseier and Random; Samuel Schetzmann and Rochus	Canada; Cynthia Neale-Ishoy and Dynasty; Eva Maria Pracht and Emirage; Gina Smith and Malte; Ashley Nicoll and Reipo
1992 Barcelona	Germany; Klaus Balkenhol and Goldstern; Nicole Uphoff and Rembrandt; Monica Theodorescu and Grunox; Isabell Werth and Gigolo	Netherlands; Tineke Bartels and Courage; Anky van Grunsven and Bonfire; Ellen Bontje and Larius; Annemarie Sanders-Keijzer and Olympic Montreux	United States; Robert Dover and Lectron; Carol Lavell and Gifted; Charlotte Bredahl and Monsieur; Michael Poulin and Graf George
1996 Atlanta	Germany; Klaus Balkenhol and Goldstern; Martin Schaudt and Durgo; Monica Theodorescu and Grunox; Isabell Werth and Gigolo	Netherlands; Tineke Bartels and Barbria; Anky van Grunsven and Bonfire; Sven Rothenberger and Weyden; Gonnelien Rothenberger and Gonnelien	United States; Robert Dover and Metallic; Michelle Gibson and Peron; Steffen Peters and Udon; Guenter Seidel and Graf George
2000 Sydney	Germany; Isabell Werth and Gigolo; Nadine Capellmann and Farbenfroh; Ulla Salzgeber and Rusty; Alexandra Simons de Ridder and Chacomo	Netherlands; Ellen Bontje and Silvano; Anky van Grunsven and Bonfire; Arjen Teeuwissen and Goliath; Coby van Baalen and Ferro	United States; Susan Blinks and Flim Flam; Robert Dover and Ranier; Guenter Seidel and Foltaire; Christine Traurig and Etienne
2004 Athens	Germany; Heike Kemmer and Bonaparte; Hubertus Schmidt and Wansuela Suerte; Martin Schaudt and Weltall; Ulla Salzgeber and Rusty	Spain; Beatriz Ferrer-Salat and Beauvalais; Juan Antonio Jimenez and Guizo; Ignacio Rambla and Oleaje; Rafael Soto and Invasor	United States; Lisa Wilcox and Relevant; Günter Seidel and Aragon; Deborah McDonald and Brentina; Robert Dover and Kennedy
2008 Beijing	Germany; Heike Kemmer and Bonaparte; Nadine Capellmann and Elvis Va; Isabell Werth and Satchmo	Netherlands; Hans Peter Minderhoud and Nadine; Imke Schellekens-Bartels and Sunrise; Anky van Grunsven and Salinero	Denmark; Anne van Olst and Clearwater; Nathalie zu Sayn-Wittgenstein and Digby; Andreas Helgstrand and Don Schufro
2012 London	Great Britain; Carl Hester on Uthopia; Laura Bechtolsheimer on Mistral Hojris; Charlotte Dujardin on Valegro	Germany; Dorothee Schneider on Diva Royal; Kristina Sprehe on Desperados; Helen Langehanenberg on Damon Hill	Netherlands; Anky van Grunsven on Salinero; Edward Gal on Undercover; Adelinde Cornelissen on Parzival
2016 Rio de Janeiro	Germany; Isabell Werth on Weihegold; Dorothee Schneider on Showtime; Kristina Bröring-Sprehe on Desperados; Sönke Rothenberger on Cosmo	Great Britain; Carl Hester on Nip Tuck; Charlotte Dujardin on Valegro; Fiona Bigwood on Orthilia; Spencer Wilton on Super Nova II	United States; Laura Graves on Verdades; Steffen Peters on Legolas; Kasey Perry-Glass on Dublet; Allison M. Brock on Rosevelt
2020 Tokyo	Germany; Jessica von Bredow-Werndl on Dalera; Dorothee Schneider on Showtime; Isabell Werth on Bella Rose	United States; Sabine Schut-Kery on Sanceo; Adrienne Lyle on Salvino; Steffen Peters on Suppenkasper	Great Britain; Charlotte Fry on Everdale; Carl Hester on En Vogue; Charlotte Dujardin on Gio
2024 Paris	Germany; Frederic Wandres on Bluetooth Old; Isabell Werth on Wendy; Jessica von Bredow-Werndl on TSF Dalera BB	Denmark; Daniel Bachmann Andersen on Vayron; Nanna Merrald Rasmussen on Zepter; Cathrine Laudrup-Dufour on Freestyle	Great Britain; Becky Moody on Jagerbomb; Carl Hester on Fame; Charlotte Fry on Glamourdale
2028 Los Angeles			

=== Discontinued events ===
==== Mixed hacks and hunters combined ====
This event was contested only at the 1900 Summer Games. The IOC website currently has affirmed a total of 95 medal events, after accepting, as it appears, the recommendation of Olympic historian Bill Mallon regarding events that should be considered "Olympic".

Games	Gold	Silver	Bronze
1900 Paris	Napoléon Murat; France	Victor Archenoul; France	Robert de Montesquiou-Fézensac; France

=== Medal table ===
after 2024 Summer Olympics

Rank	Nation	Gold	Silver	Bronze	Total
1	Germany	16	9	5	30
2	Sweden	7	5	7	19
3	West Germany	7	3	3	13
4	France	4	6	3	13
5	Soviet Union	4	3	3	10
6	Switzerland	3	6	4	13
7	Netherlands	3	6	3	12
8	Great Britain	3	1	5	9
9	United Team of Germany	1	2	2	5
10	Austria	1	0	1	2
11	Denmark	0	4	1	5
12	United States	0	2	8	10
13	Spain	0	1	1	2
14	Bulgaria	0	1	0	1
15	Canada	0	0	1	1
15	Portugal	0	0	1	1
15	Romania	0	0	1	1
Totals (17 entries)		49	49	49	147

== Eventing ==
=== Eventing, individual ===
Games	Gold	Silver	Bronze
1912 Stockholm	Axel Nordlander on Lady Artist; Sweden	Friedrich von Rochow on Idealist; Germany	Jacques Cariou on Cocotte; France
1920 Antwerp	Helmer Mörner on Germania; Sweden	Åge Lundström on Yrsa; Sweden	Ettore Caffaratti on Caniche; Italy
1924 Paris	Adolph van der Voort van Zijp on Silver-Piece; Netherlands	Frode Kirkebjerg on Metoo; Denmark	Sloan Doak on Pathfinder; United States
1928 Amsterdam	Charles Pahud de Mortanges on Marcroix; Netherlands	Gerard de Kruijff on Va-T'en; Netherlands	Bruno Neumann on Ilja; Germany
1932 Los Angeles	Charles Pahud de Mortanges on Marcroix; Netherlands	Earl Foster Thomson on Jenny Camp; United States	Clarence von Rosen Jr. on Sunnyside Maid; Sweden
1936 Berlin	Ludwig Stubbendorf on Nurmi; Germany	Earl Foster Thomson on Jenny Camp; United States	Hans Lunding on Jason; Denmark
1948 London	Bernard Chevallier on Alglonne; France	Frank Henry on Swing Low; United States	Robert Selfelt on Claque; Sweden
1952 Helsinki	Hans von Blixen-Finecke Jr. on Jubal; Sweden	Guy Lefrant on Verdun; France	Wilhelm Büsing on Hubertus; Germany
1956 Stockholm	Petrus Kastenman on Iluster; Sweden	August Lütke-Westhues on Trux von Kamax; United Team of Germany	Francis Weldon on Kilbarry; Great Britain
1960 Rome	Lawrence Morgan on Salad Days; Australia	Neale Lavis on Mirrabooka; Australia	Anton Bühler on Gay-Spark; Switzerland
1964 Tokyo	Mauro Checcoli on Surbean; Italy	Carlos Moratorio on Chalan; Argentina	Fritz Ligges on Donkosak; United Team of Germany
1968 Mexico City	Jean-Jacques Guyon on Pitou; France	Derek Allhusen on Lochinvar; Great Britain	Michael Page on Foster; United States
1972 Munich	Richard Meade on Laurieston; Great Britain	Alessandro Argenton on Woodland; Italy	Jan Jönsson on Sarajevo; Sweden
1976 Montreal	Edmund Coffin on Bally-Cor; United States	Michael Plumb on Better & Bette; United States	Karl Schultz on Madrigal; West Germany
1980 Moscow	Federico Roman on Rossinan; Italy	Aleksandr Blinov on Galzun; Soviet Union	Yuri Salnikov on Pintset; Soviet Union
1984 Los Angeles	Mark Todd on Charisma; New Zealand	Karen Stives on Ben Arthur; United States	Virginia Holgate on Priceless; Great Britain
1988 Seoul	Mark Todd on Charisma; New Zealand	Ian Stark on Sir Wattie; Great Britain	Virginia Leng on Master Craftsman; Great Britain
1992 Barcelona	Matthew Ryan on Kibah Tic Toc; Australia	Herbert Blocker on Feine Dame; Germany	Blyth Tait on Messiah; New Zealand
1996 Atlanta	Blyth Tait on Ready Teddy; New Zealand	Sally Clark on Squirrel Hill; New Zealand	Kerry Millikin on Out and About; United States
2000 Sydney	David O'Connor on Custom Made; United States	Andrew Hoy on Swizzle In; Australia	Mark Todd on Eyespy II; New Zealand
2004 Athens	Leslie Law on Shear L'Eau; Great Britain	Kimberly Severson on Winsome Andante; United States	Philippa Funnell on Primmore's Pride; Great Britain
2008 Beijing	Hinrich Romeike on Marius; Germany	Gina Miles on McKinlaigh; United States	Kristina Cook on Miners Frolic; Great Britain
2012 London	Michael Jung on Sam; Germany	Sara Algotsson Ostholt on Wega; Sweden	Sandra Auffarth on Opgun Louvo; Germany
2016 Rio de Janeiro	Michael Jung on Sam; Germany	Astier Nicolas on Piaf de B'Neville; France	Phillip Dutton on Mighty Nice; United States
2020 Tokyo	Julia Krajewski on Amande de B'Neville; Germany	Tom McEwen on Toledo de Kerser; Great Britain	Andrew Hoy on Vassily de Lassos; Australia
2024 Paris	Michael Jung on Chipmunk FRH; Germany	Cristopher Burton on Shadow Man; Australia	Laura Collett on London 52; Great Britain
2028 Los Angeles			

=== Eventing, team ===
Games	Gold	Silver	Bronze
1912 Stockholm	Sweden; Axel Nordlander on Lady Artist; Nils Adlercreutz on Atout; Ernst Casparsson on Irmelin; Henric Horn af Åminne on Omen	Germany; Friedrich von Rochow on Idealist; Richard Graf von Schaesberg-Tannheim on Grundsee; Eduard von Lütcken on Blue Boy; Carl von Moers on May-Queen	United States; Ben Lear on Poppy; John Montgomery on Deceive; Guy Henry on Chiswell; Ephraim Graham on Connie
1920 Antwerp	Sweden; Helmer Mörner on Germania; Åge Lundström on Ysra; Georg von Braun on Diana; Gustaf Dyrsch on Salamis	Italy; Ettore Caffaratti on Caniche; Garibaldi Spighi on Otello; Giulio Cacciandra on Facetto; Carlo Asinari on Savari	Belgium; Roger Moeremans d'Emaüs on Sweet Girl; Oswald Lints on Martha; Jules Bonvalet on Weppelghem; Jacques Misonne on Gaucho
1924 Paris	Netherlands; Adolph van der Voort van Zijp on Silver Piece; Charles Pahud de Mortanges on Johnny Walker; Gerard de Kruijff on Addio; Antonius Colenbrander on King of Hearts	Sweden; Claës König on Bojar; Torsten Sylvan on Anita; Gustaf Hagelin on Varius; Carl Gustaf Lewenhaupt on Canter	Italy; Alberto Lombardi on Pimplo; Alessandro Alvisi on Capiligio; Emanuele Beraudo di Pralormo on Mount Félix; Tommaso Lequio di Assaba on Torena
1928 Amsterdam	Netherlands; Charles Pahud de Mortanges on Marcroix; Gerard de Kruijff on Va-T'en; Adolph van der Voort van Zijp on Silver Piece	Norway; Bjart Ording on And Over; Arthur Qvist on Hidalgo; Eugen Johansen on Baby	Poland; Michał Antoniewicz on Moja Miła; Józef Trenkwald on Lwi Pazur; Karol Rómmel on Doneuse
1932 Los Angeles	United States; Earl Foster Thomson on Jenny Camp; Harry Chamberlin on Pleasant Smiles; Edwin Argo on Honolulu Tomboy	Netherlands; Charles Pahud de Mortanges on Marcroix; Karel Schummelketel on Duiveltje; Aernout van Lennep on Henk	No Bronze awarded (Note: This was because only two teams finished the competition.)
1936 Berlin	Germany; Ludwig Stubbendorf on Nurmi; Rudolf Lippert on Fasan; Konrad Freiherr von Wangenheim on Kurfürst	Poland; Henryk Roycewicz on Arlekin III; Zdzisław Kawecki on Bambino; Seweryn Kulesza on Tóska	Great Britain; Alec Scott on Bob Clive; Edward Howard-Vyse on Blue Steel; Richard Fanshawe on Bowie Knife
1948 London	United States; Frank Henry on Swing Low; Charles Anderson on Reno Palisade; Earl Foster Thomson on Reno Rhythm	Sweden; Robert Selfelt on Claque; Olof Stahre on Komet; Sigurd Svensson on Dust	Mexico; Humberto Mariles on Parral; Raúl Campero on Tarahumara; Joaquín Solano on Malinche
1952 Helsinki	Sweden; Hans von Blixen-Finecke Jr. on Jubal; Olof Stahre on Komet; Folke Frölén on Fair	Germany; Wilhelm Büsing on Hubertus; Klaus Wagner on Dachs; Otto Rothe on Trux von Kamax	United States; Charles Hough Jr. on Cassivellannus; Walter Staley Jr. on Craigwood Park; John Wofford on Benny Grimes
1956 Stockholm	Great Britain; Francis Weldon on Kilbarry; Arthur Rook on Wild Venture; Bertie Hill on Countyman III	United Team of Germany; August Lütke-Westhues on Trux von Kamax; Otto Rothe on Sissi; Klaus Wagner on Prinzeß	Canada; John Rumble on Cilroy; Jim Elder on Colleen; Brian Herbinson on Tara
1960 Rome	Australia; Lawrence Morgan and Salad Days; Neale Lavis and Mirrabooka; Bill Roycroft and Our Solo	Switzerland; Anton Bühler and Gay Spark; Hans Schwarzenbach and Burn Trout; Rudolf Günthardt and Atbara	France; Jack le Goff and Image; Guy Lefrant and Nicias; Jehan le Roy and Garden
1964 Tokyo	Italy; Mauro Checcoli and Surbean; Paolo Angioni and King; Giuseppe Ravano and Royal Love	United States; Michael Page and Grasshopper; Kevin Freeman and Gallopade; Michael Plumb and Bold Minstrel	United Team of Germany; Fritz Ligges and Donkosak; Horst Karsten and Condora; Gerhard Schulz and Balza X
1968 Mexico City	Great Britain; Derek Allhusen and Lochinvar; Richard Meade and Cornishman V Reuben Jones and The Poacher	United States; Michael Page and Foster; James C. Wofford and Kilkenny; Michael Plumb and Plain Sailing	Australia; Wayne Roycroft and Zhivago; Brien Cobcroft and Depeche; Bill Roycroft and Warrathoola
1972 Munich	Great Britain; Richard Meade and Laurieston; Mary Gordon-Watson and Cornishman V Bridget Parker and Cornish Gold; Mark Phillips and Great Ovation	United States; Kevin Freeman and Good Mixture; Bruce Davidson and Plain Sailing; Michael Plumb and Free and Easy; James C. Wofford and Kilkenny	West Germany; Harry Klugmann and Christopher Robert; Ludwig Gössing and Chicago; Karl Schultz and Pisco; Horst Karsten and Sioux
1976 Montreal	United States; Edmund Coffin and Bally-Cor; Michael Plumb and Better & Better; Bruce Davidson and Irish-Cap; Mary Anne Tauskey and Marcus Aurelius	West Germany; Karl Schultz and Madrigal; Herbert Blöcker and Albrant; Helmut Rethemeier and Pauline; Otto Ammermann and Volturno	Australia; Wayne Roycroft and Laurenson; Mervyn Bennet and Regal Reign; Bill Roycroft and Version; Denis Pigott and Hillstead
1980 Moscow	Soviet Union; Aleksandr Blinov and Galzun; Yuri Salnikov and Pintset; Valery Volkov and Tskheti; Sergey Rogozhin and Gelespont	Italy; Federico Roman and Rossinan; Anna Casagrande and Daleye; Mauro Roman and Dourakine 4 Marina Sciocchetti and Rohan de Lechereo	Mexico; Yocupicio Manuel Mendivil and Alymony; Rios David Barcena and Bombon; Soto Jose Luis Perez and Quelite; Lopez Fabian Vazquez and Cocaleco
1984 Los Angeles	United States; Michael Plumb and Blue Stone; Karen Stives and Ben Arthur; Torrance Fleischmann and Finvarra; Bruce Davidson and JJ Babu	Great Britain; Virginia Leng and Priceless; Ian Stark and Oxford Blue; Diana Clapham and Windjammer; Lucinda Green and Regal Realm	West Germany; Bettina Overesch and Peacetime; Burkhard Tesdorpf and Freedom; Claus Erhorn and Fair Lady; Dietmar Hogrefe and Foliant
1988 Seoul	West Germany; Claus Erhorn and Justyn Thyme; Matthias Baumann and Shamrock; Thies Kaspareit and Sherry; Ralf Ehrenbrink and Uncle Todd	Great Britain; Mark Phillips and Cartier; Karen Straker and Get Smart; Virginia Leng and Master Craftsman; Ian Stark and Sir Wattie	New Zealand; Mark Todd and Charisma; Margaret Knighton and Enterprise; Andrew Bennie and Grayshott; Tinks Pottinger and Volunteer
1992 Barcelona	Australia; David Green and Duncan II; Gillian Rolton and Peppermint Grove; Andrew Hoy and Kiwi; Matthew Ryan and Kibah Tic Toc	New Zealand; Blyth Tait and Missiah; Andrew Nicholson and Spinning Rhombus; Mark Todd and Welton Greylag; Victoria Latta and Chief	Germany; Herbert Bloecker and Feine Dame; Ralf Ehrenbrink and Kildare II; Matthias Baumann and Alabaster; Cord Mysegages and Ricardo
1996 Atlanta	Australia; Wendy Schaeffer and Sunburst; Gillian Rolton and Peppermint Grove; Andrew Hoy and Darien Powers; Phillip Dutton and True Blue Girdwood	United States; Karen O'Connor and Biko; David O'Connor and Giltedge; Bruce Davidson and Heyday; Jill Henneberg and Nirvana	New Zealand; Blyth Tait and Chesterfield; Andrew Nicholson and Jaggermeister II; Vaughn Jefferis and Bounce; Victoria Latta and Broadcast News
2000 Sydney	Australia; Phillip Dutton and House Doctor; Andrew Hoy and Darien Powers; Stuart Tinney and Jeepster; Matt Ryan and Kibah Sandstone	Great Britain; Ian Stark and Jaybee; Jeanette Brakewell and Over To You; Pippa Funnell and Supreme Rock; Leslie Law and Shear H2O	United States; Nina Fout and 3 Magic Beans; Karen O'Connor and Prince Panache; David O'Connor and Giltedge; Linden Wiesman and Anderoo
2004 Athens	France; Arnaud Boiteau and Expo du Moulin; Cédric Lyard and Fine Merveille; Didier Courrèges and Débat d'Estruval; Jean Teulère and Espoir de la Mère; Nicolas Touzaint and Galan de Sauvegère	Great Britain; Jeanette Brakewell and Over To You; Mary King and King Solomon III; Leslie Law and Shear L'Eau; Pippa Funnell and Primmore's Pride; William Fox-Pitt and Tamarillo	United States; Kimberly Severson and Winsome Adante; Darren Chiacchia and Windfall II; John Williams and Carrick; Amy Tryon and Poggio II; Julie Richards and Jacob Two Two
2008 Beijing	Germany; Peter Thomsen and The Ghost of Hamish; Frank Ostholt and Mr. Medicott; Andreas Dibowski and Butts Leon; Ingrid Klimke and Abraxxas; Hinrich Romeike and Marius	Australia; Shane Rose and All Luck; Sonja Johnson and Ringwould Jaguar; Lucinda Fredericks and Headley Britannia; Clayton Fredericks and Ben Along Time; Megan Jones and Irish Jester	Great Britain; Sharon Hunt and Tankers Town; Daisy Dick and Spring Along; William Fox-Pitt and Parkmore Ed; Kristina Cook and Miners Frolic; Mary King and Call Again Cavalier
2012 London	Germany; Peter Thomsen on Barny; Dirk Schrade on King Artus; Ingrid Klimke on Butts Abraxxas; Sandra Auffarth on Opgun Louvo; Michael Jung on Sam	Great Britain; Nicola Wilson on Opposition Buzz; Mary King on Imperial Cavalier; Zara Phillips on High Kingdom; Kristina Cook on Miners Frolic; William Fox-Pitt on Lionheart	New Zealand; Jonelle Richards on Flintstar; Jonathan Paget on Clifton Promise; Caroline Powell on Lenamore; Andrew Nicholson on Nereo; Mark Todd on Campino
2016 Rio de Janeiro	France; Karim Laghouag on Entebbe; Thibaut Vallette on Qing du Briot; Mathieu Lemoine on Bart L Astier Nicolas on Piaf de B'Neville	Germany; Julia Krajewski on Samourai du Thot; Sandra Auffarth on Opgun Louvo; Ingrid Klimke on Hale-Bob Old; Michael Jung on Sam	Australia; Shane Rose on CP Qualified; Stuart Tinney on Pluto Mio; Sam Griffiths on Paulank Brockagh; Christopher Burton on Santano II
2020 Tokyo	Great Britain; Laura Collett on London 52; Tom McEwen on Toledo de Kerser; Oliver Townend on Ballaghmore Class	Australia; Kevin McNab on Don Quidam; Andrew Hoy on Vassily de Lassos; Shane Rose on Virgil	France; Nicolas Touzaint on Absolut Gold; Karim Laghouag on Triton Fontaine; Christopher Six on Totem de Brecey
2024 Paris	Great Britain; Rosalind Canter on Lordships Graffalo; Tom McEwen on JD Dublin; Laura Collett on London 52	France; Nicolas Touzaint on Diabolo Menthe; Karim Laghouag on Triton Fontaine; Stéphane Landois on Chaman Dumontceau	Japan; Toshiyuki Tanaka on Jefferson; Kazuma Tomoto on Vinci De La Vigne; Yoshiaki Oiwa on Mgh Grafton Street; Ryuzo Kitajima on Cekatinka
2028 Los Angeles			

=== Medal table ===
Rank	Nation	Gold	Silver	Bronze	Total
1	Germany	9	5	4	18
2	Great Britain	7	8	8	23
3	Sweden	7	4	3	14
4	United States	6	11	8	25
5	Australia	6	5	4	15
6	Netherlands	5	2	0	7
7	France	4	3	3	10
8	Italy	3	3	2	8
9	New Zealand	3	2	5	10
10	West Germany	1	1	3	5
11	Soviet Union	1	1	1	3
12	United Team of Germany	0	2	2	4
13	Denmark	0	1	1	2
13	Poland	0	1	1	2
13	Switzerland	0	1	1	2
16	Argentina	0	1	0	1
16	Norway	0	1	0	1
18	Mexico	0	0	2	2
19	Belgium	0	0	1	1
19	Canada	0	0	1	1
19	Japan	0	0	1	1
Totals (21 entries)		52	52	51	155

== Jumping ==
=== Jumping, individual ===
Games	Gold	Silver	Bronze
1900 Paris	Aimé Haegeman on Benton II; Belgium	Georges Van Der Poele on Windsor Squire; Belgium	Louis de Champsavin on Terpsichore; France
1904–1908	not included in the Olympic program		
1912 Stockholm	Jacques Cariou on Mignon; France	Rabod von Kröcher on Dohna; Germany	Emmanuel de Blommaert on Clonmore; Belgium
1920 Antwerp	Tommaso Lequio di Assaba on Trebecco; Italy	Alessandro Valerio on Cento; Italy	Carl Gustaf Lewenhaupt on Mon Coeur; Sweden
1924 Paris	Alphonse Gemuseus on Lucette; Switzerland	Tommaso Lequio di Assaba on Trebecco; Italy	Adam Królikiewicz on Picador; Poland
1928 Amsterdam	František Ventura on Elliot; Czechoslovakia	Pierre Bertran de Balanda on Papillon; France	Charles-Gustave Kuhn on Pepita; Switzerland
1932 Los Angeles	Takeichi Nishi on Uranus; Japan	Harry Chamberlin on Show Girl; United States	Clarence von Rosen Jr. on Empire; Sweden
1936 Berlin	Kurt Hasse on Tora; Germany	Henri Rang on Delfis; Romania	József von Platthy on Sello; Hungary
1948 London	Humberto Mariles Cortés on Arete; Mexico	Rubén Uriza on Harvey; Mexico	Jean-François d'Orgeix on Sucre de Pomme; France
1952 Helsinki	Pierre Jonquères d'Oriola on Ali Baba; France	Oscar Cristi on Bambi; Chile	Fritz Thiedemann on Meteor; Germany
1956 Stockholm	Hans Günter Winkler on Halla; United Team of Germany	Raimondo D'Inzeo on Merano; Italy	Piero D'Inzeo on Uruguay; Italy
1960 Rome	Raimondo D'Inzeo on Posillipo; Italy	Piero D'Inzeo on The Rock; Italy	David Broome on Sunsalve; Great Britain
1964 Tokyo	Pierre Jonquères d'Oriola on Lutteur; France	Hermann Schridde on Dozent; United Team of Germany	Peter Robeson on Firecrest; Great Britain
1968 Mexico City	William Steinkraus on Snowbound; United States	Marion Coakes on Stroller; Great Britain	David Broome on Mister Softee; Great Britain
1972 Munich	Graziano Mancinelli on Ambassador; Italy	Ann Moore on Psalm; Great Britain	Neal Shapiro on Sloopy; United States
1976 Montreal	Alwin Schockemöhle on Warwick Rex; West Germany	Michel Vaillancourt on Branch County; Canada	Francois Mathy on Gai Luron; Belgium
1980 Moscow	Jan Kowalczyk on Artemor; Poland	Nikolai Korolkov on Espadron; Soviet Union	Joaquín Perez Heras on Alymony; Mexico
1984 Los Angeles	Joseph Fargis on Touch of Class; United States	Conrad Homfeld on Abdullah; United States	Heidi Robbiani on Jessica V Switzerland
1988 Seoul	Pierre Durand Jr. on Jappeloup; France	Greg Best on Gem Twist; United States	Karsten Huck on Nepomuk; West Germany
1992 Barcelona	Ludger Beerbaum on Classic Touch; Germany	Piet Raymakers on Ratina Z Netherlands	Norman Dello Joio on Irish; United States
1996 Atlanta	Ulrich Kirchhoff on Jus de Pomme; Germany	Willi Melliger on Calvaro V Switzerland	Alexandra Ledermann on Rochet M France
2000 Sydney	Jeroen Dubbeldam on De Sjiem; Netherlands	Albert Voorn on Lando; Netherlands	Khaled Al-Eid on Khashm Al Aan; Saudi Arabia
2004 Athens	Rodrigo Pessoa on Baloubet du Rouet; Brazil	Chris Kappler on Royal Kaliber; United States	Marco Kutscher on Montender; Germany
2008 Beijing	Eric Lamaze on Hickstead; Canada	Rolf-Göran Bengtsson on Ninja; Sweden	Beezie Madden on Authentic; United States
2012 London	Steve Guerdat on Nino Des Buissonets; Switzerland	Gerco Schroder on London; Netherlands	Cian O'Connor on Blue Loyd; Ireland
2016 Rio de Janeiro	Nick Skelton on Big Star; Great Britain	Peder Fredricson on All In; Sweden	Eric Lamaze on Fine Lady; Canada
2020 Tokyo	Ben Maher on Explosion W Great Britain	Peder Fredricson on All In; Sweden	Maikel van der Vleuten on Beauville Z Netherlands
2024 Paris	Christian Kukuk on Checker 47; Germany	Steve Guerdat on Dynamix de Belheme; Switzerland	Maikel van der Vleuten on Beauville Z Netherlands
2028 Los Angeles			

=== Jumping, team ===
Games	Gold	Silver	Bronze
1912 Stockholm	Sweden; Gustaf Lewenhaupt on Medusa; Gustaf Kilman on Gåtan; Hans von Rosen on Lord Iron; Fredrik Rosencrantz on Drabant	France; Pierre Dufour d'Astafort on Amazone; Jacques Cariou on Mignon; Ernest Meyer on Allons-y; Gaston Seigner on Cocotte	Germany; Sigismund Freyer on Ultimus; Wilhelm Graf von Hohenau on Pretty Girl; Ernst Deloch on Hubertus; Prince Friedrich Karl of Prussia on Gibson Boy
1920 Antwerp	Sweden; Claës König on Tresor; Hans von Rosen on Poor Boy; Daniel Norling on Eros II; Frank Martin on Kohort	Belgium; Henri Laame on Biscuit; André Coumans on Lisette; Herman de Gaiffier d'Hestroy on Miss; Herman d'Oultromont on Lord Kitchener	Italy; Ettore Caffaratti on Tradittore; Alessandro Alvisi on Raggio di Sole; Giulio Cacciandra on Fortunello; Carlo Asinari on Varone
1924 Paris	Sweden; Åke Thelning on Loke; Axel Ståhle on Cecil; Åge Lundström on Anvers	Switzerland; Alphonse Gemuseus on Lucette; Werner Stuber on Girandole; Hans Bühler on Sailor Boy	Portugal; António Borges on Reginald; Hélder de Souza on Avro; José Mouzinho on Hetrugo
1928 Amsterdam	Spain; José Navarro Morenés on Zapatazo; José Álvarez de Bohórquez on Zalamero; Julio García Fernández de los Ríos on Revistade	Poland; Kazimierz Gzowski on Mylord; Kazimierz Szosland on Ali; Michał Antoniewicz on Readgleadt	Sweden; Karl Hansén on Gerold; Carl Björnstjerna on Kornett; Ernst Hallberg on Loke
1932 Los Angeles	No medalists (no nation completed the course with three riders).		
1936 Berlin	Germany; Kurt Hasse on Tora; Marten von Barnekow on Nordland; Heinz Brandt on Alchimist	Netherlands; Johan Greter on Ernica; Jan de Bruine on Trixie; Henri van Schaik on Santa Bell	Portugal; José Beltrão on Biscuit; Domingos de Sousa on Merle Blanc; Luís Mena e Silva on Fossette
1948 London	Mexico; Humberto Mariles on Arete; Rubén Uriza on Harvey; Alberto Valdés on Chihuchoc	Spain; Jaime García on Bizarro; José Navarro Morenés on Quórum; Marcellino Gavilán on Forajido	Great Britain; Harry Llewellyn on Foxhunter; Henry Nicoll on Kilgeddin; Arthur Carr on Monty
1952 Helsinki	Great Britain; Wilfred White on Nizefela; Douglas Stewart on Aherlow; Harry Llewellyn on Foxhunter	Chile; Óscar Cristi on Bambi; César Mendoza on Pillán; Ricardo Echeverría on Lindo Peal	United States; William Steinkraus on Hollandia; Arthur McCashin on Miss Budweiser; John William Russell on Democrat
1956 Stockholm	United Team of Germany; Hans Günter Winkler on Halla; Fritz Thiedemann on Meteor; Alfons Lütke-Westhues on Ala	Italy; Raimondo D'Inzeo on Merano; Piero D'Inzeo on Uruguay; Salvatore Oppes on Pagoro	Great Britain; Wilfred White on Nizefela; Pat Smythe on Flanagan; Peter Robeson on Scorchin
1960 Rome	United Team of Germany; Hans Günter Winkler and Halla; Fritz Thiedemann and Meteor; Alwin Schockemöhle and Ferdl	United States; Frank Chapot and Trail Guide; William Steinkraus and Ksar d'Esprit; George H. Morris and Sinjon	Italy; Raimondo D'Inzeo and Posillipo; Piero D'Inzeo and The Rock; Antonio Oppes and The Scholar
1964 Tokyo	United Team of Germany; Hermann Schridde and Dozent II; Kurt Jarasinski and Torro; Hans Günter Winkler and Fidelitas	France; Pierre Jonquères d'Oriola and Lutteur B Janou Lefèbvre and Kenavo D Guy Lefrant and Monsieur de Littry	Italy; Piero D'Inzeo and Sun Beam; Raimondo D'Inzeo and Posillipo; Graziano Mancinelli and Rockette
1968 Mexico City	Canada; Jim Day and Canadian Club; Thomas Gayford and Big Dee; Jim Elder and The Immigrant	France; Jean Rozier and Quo Vadis; Janou Lefèbvre and Rocket; Pierre Jonquères d'Oriola and Nagir	West Germany; Hermann Schridde and Dozent II; Alwin Schockemöhle and Donald Rex; Hans Günter Winkler and Enigk
1972 Munich	West Germany; Fritz Ligges and Robin; Gerhard Wiltfang and Askan; Hartwig Steenken and Simona; Hans Günter Winkler and Trophy	United States; William Steinkraus and Main Spring; Neal Shapiro and Sloopy; Kathryn Kusner and Fleet Apple; Frank Chapot and White Lightning	Italy; Vittorio Orlandi and Fulmer Feather; Raimondo D'Inzeo and Fiorello; Graziano Mancinelli and Ambassador; Piero D'Inzeo and Easter Light
1976 Montreal	France; Hubert Parot and Rivage; Jean-Marcel Rozier and Bayard de Maupas; Marc Roguet and Belle de Mars; Michel Roche and Un Espoir	West Germany; Alwin Schockemöhle and Warwick Rex; Hans Günter Winkler and Torphy; Sönke Sönksen and Kwepe; Paul Schockemöhle and Agent	Belgium; Eric Wauters and Gute Sitte; François Mathy and Gai Luron; Edgar-Henri Cuepper and Le Champion; Stanny Van Paesschen and Porsche
1980 Moscow	Soviet Union; Vyacheslav Chukanov and Gepatit; Viktor Poganovsky and Topky; Viktor Asmaev and Reis; Nikolai Korolkov and Espadron	Poland; Marian Kozicki and Bremen; Jan Kowalczyk and Artemor; Wiesław Hartman and Norton; Janusz Bobik and Szampan	Mexico; Joaquín Perez Heras and Alymony; Jesus Gomez Portugal and Massacre; Valencia Gerardo Tazzer and Caribe; Alberto Valdes Lacarra and Lady Mirka
1984 Los Angeles	United States; Joseph Fargis and Touch of Class; Conrad Homfeld and Abdullah; Leslie Burr Howard and Albany; Melanie Smith and Calypso	Great Britain; Michael Whitaker and Overton Amanda; John Whitaker and Ryans Son; Steven Smith and Shining Example; Timothy Grubb and Linky	West Germany; Paul Schockemöhle and Deister; Peter Luther and Livius; Franke Sloothaak and Farmer; Fritz Ligges and Ramzes
1988 Seoul	West Germany; Ludger Beerbaum and The Freak; Wolfgang Brinkmann and Pedro; Dirk Hafemeister and Orchidee; Franke Sloothaak and Walzerkonig	United States; Greg Best and Gem Twist; Lisa Ann Jacquin and For the Moment; Anne Kursinski and Starman; Joseph Fargis and Mill Pearl	France; Hubert Bourdy and Morgat; Frédéric Cottier and Flambeau C Michel Robert and La Fayette; Pierre Durand Jr. and Jappeloup de Luze
1992 Barcelona	Netherlands; Piet Raijmakers and Ratina Z Bert Romp and Waldo E Jan Tops and Top Gun; Jos Lansink and Egano	Austria; Boris Boor and Love Me Tender; Joerg Muenzner and Graf Grande; Hugo Simon and Apricot D Thomas Fruehmann and Genius	France; Hervé Godignon and Quidam de Revel; Hubert Bourdy and Razzina du Poncel; Michel Robert and Nonix; Eric Navet and Quito de Baussy
1996 Atlanta	Germany; Franke Sloothaak and Joly Coeur; Lars Nieberg and For Pleasure; Ulrich Kirchhoff and Jus De Pommes; Ludger Beerbaum and Ratina Z	United States; Peter Leone and Legato; Leslie Burr Howard and Extreme; Anne Kursinski and Eros; Michael R. Matz and Rhum	Brazil; Luiz Felipe De Azevedo and Cassiana; Álvaro Miranda Neto and Aspen; André Johannpeter and Calei; Rodrigo Pessoa and Tomboy
2000 Sydney	Germany; Ludger Beerbaum on Goldfever; Lars Nieberg on Esprit FRH; Marcus Ehning on For Pleasure; Otto Becker on Dobels Cento	Switzerland; Markus Fuchs on Tinka's Boy; Beat Maendli on Pozitano; Lesley McNaught on Dulf; Willi Melliger on Calvaro V	Brazil; Rodrigo Pessoa on Baloubet du Rouet; Luiz Felipe De Azevedo on Ralph; Álvaro Miranda Neto on Aspen; André Johannpeter on Calei
2004 Athens	United States; Peter Wylde on Fein Cera; McLain Ward on Sapphire; Beezie Madden on Authentic; Chris Kappler on Royal Kaliber	Sweden; Rolf-Göran Bengtsson on Mac Kinley; Malin Baryard on Butterfly Flip; Peter Eriksson on Cardento; Peder Fredericson on Magic Bengtsson	Germany; Otto Becker on Dobels Cento; Marco Kutscher on Montender 2 Christian Ahlmann on Cöster
2008 Beijing	United States; McLain Ward on Sapphire; Laura Kraut on Cedric; Will Simpson on Carlsson vom Dach; Beezie Madden on Authentic	Canada; Jill Henselwood on Special Ed; Eric Lamaze on Hickstead; Ian Millar on In Style; Mac Cone on Ole	Switzerland; Christina Liebherr on No Mercy; Pius Schwizer on Nobless M Niklaus Schurtenberger on Cantus; Steve Guerdat on Jalisca Solier
2012 London	Great Britain; Scott Brash on Hello Sanctos; Peter Charles on Vindicat; Ben Maher on Tripple X Nick Skelton on Big Star	Netherlands; Marc Houtzager on Tamino; Gerco Schroder on London; Maikel van der Vleuten on Verdi; Jur Vrieling on Bubalu	Saudi Arabia; Ramzy Al Duhami on Bayard Van the Villa There; Abdullah bin Mutaib Al Saud on Davos; Kamal Bahamdan on Noblesse Des Tess; Abdullah Waleed Sharbatly on Sultan
2016 Rio de Janeiro	France; Philippe Rozier on Rahotep de Toscane; Kevin Staut on Rêveur de Hurtebise; Roger-Yves Bost on Sydney une Prince; Pénélope Leprevost on Flora de Mariposa	United States; Kent Farrington on Voyeur; Lucy Davis on Barron; McLain Ward on HH Azur; Beezie Madden on Cortes 'C''	Germany; Christian Ahlmann on Taloubet Z Meredith Michaels-Beerbaum on Fibonacci; Daniel Deusser on First Class; Ludger Beerbaum on Casello
2020 Tokyo	Sweden; Henrik von Eckermann on King Edward; Malin Baryard-Johnsson on Indiana; Peder Fredricson on All In	United States; Laura Kraut on Baloutinue; Jessica Springsteen on Don Juan van de Donkhoeve; McLain Ward on Contagious	Belgium; Pieter Devos on Claire Z Jérôme Guery on Quel Homme de Hus; Grégory Wathelet on Nevados S
2024 Paris	Great Britain; Ben Maher on Dallas Vegas Batilly; Harry Charles on Romeo 88; Scott Brash on Jefferson	United States; Laura Kraut on Baloutinue; Karl Cook on Caracole de la Roque; McLain Ward on Ilex	France; Simon Delestre on I.Alemusina R 51; Olivier Perreau on Dorai D'Aiguilly; Julien Epaillard on Dubai du Cèdre
2028 Los Angeles			

=== Discontinued events ===
==== High jump ====
Games	Gold	Silver	Bronze
1900 Paris	Dominique Gardères; France	none awarded (Note: Two first-place prizes were awarded due to the top two competitors tying for the highest jump, at 1.8 metres (71 in))	Georges Van Der Poele; Belgium
1900 Paris	Gian Giorgio Trissino; Italy	none awarded	Georges Van Der Poele; Belgium

==== Long jump ====
Games	Gold	Silver	Bronze
1900 Paris	Constant van Langhendonck; Belgium	Gian Giorgio Trissino; Italy	Jacques de Prunelé; France

=== Medal table ===
Rank	Nation	Gold	Silver	Bronze	Total
1	France	8	6	9	23
2	Germany	7	1	5	13
3	United States	5	11	4	20
4	Great Britain	5	3	5	13
5	Italy	4	6	5	15
6	Sweden	4	4	3	11
7	United Team of Germany	4	1	0	5
8	Belgium	3	2	5	10
9	West Germany	3	1	3	7
10	Netherlands	2	5	2	9
11	Switzerland	2	4	3	9
12	Canada	2	2	1	5
13	Mexico	2	1	2	5
14	Poland	1	2	1	4
15	Soviet Union	1	1	0	2
15	Spain	1	1	0	2
17	Brazil	1	0	2	3
18	Czechoslovakia	1	0	0	1
18	Japan	1	0	0	1
20	Chile	0	2	0	2
21	Austria	0	1	0	1
21	Romania	0	1	0	1
23	Portugal	0	0	2	2
23	Saudi Arabia	0	0	2	2
25	Hungary	0	0	1	1
25	Ireland	0	0	1	1
Totals (26 entries)		57	55	56	168

== Discontinued disciplines ==
=== Driving ===
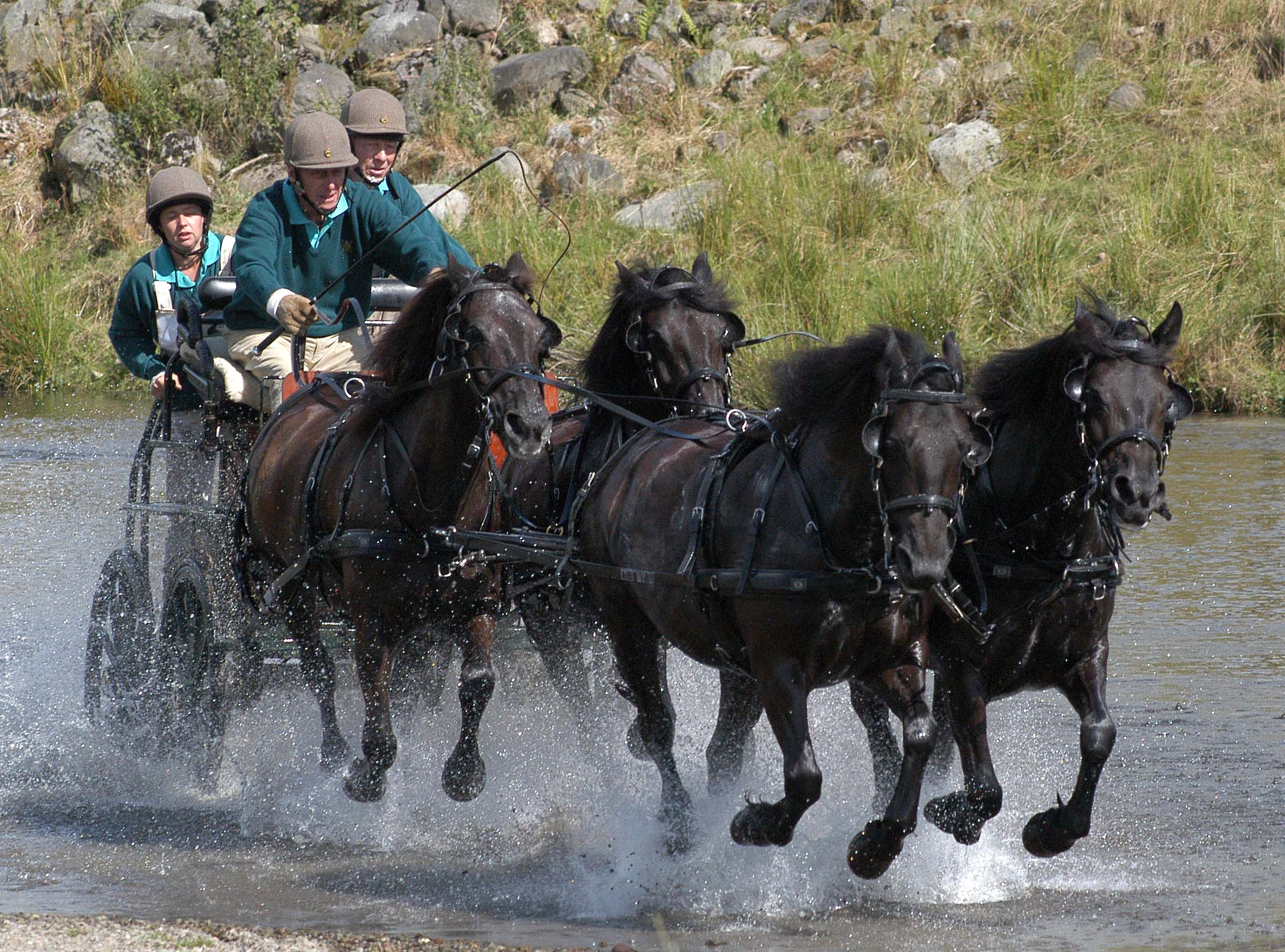
A four-in-hand driving team

==== Mail coach ====
This event was also known as the "Mixed four-in-hand", and appears that way in some references. The event was contested only at the 1900 Summer Games. The IOC website currently has affirmed a total of 95 medal events, after accepting, as it appears, the recommendation of Olympic historian Bill Mallon regarding events that should be considered "Olympic".

Games	Gold	Silver	Bronze
1900 Paris	Georges Nagelmackers; Belgium	Léon Thome; France	Jean de Neuflize; France

=== Vaulting ===
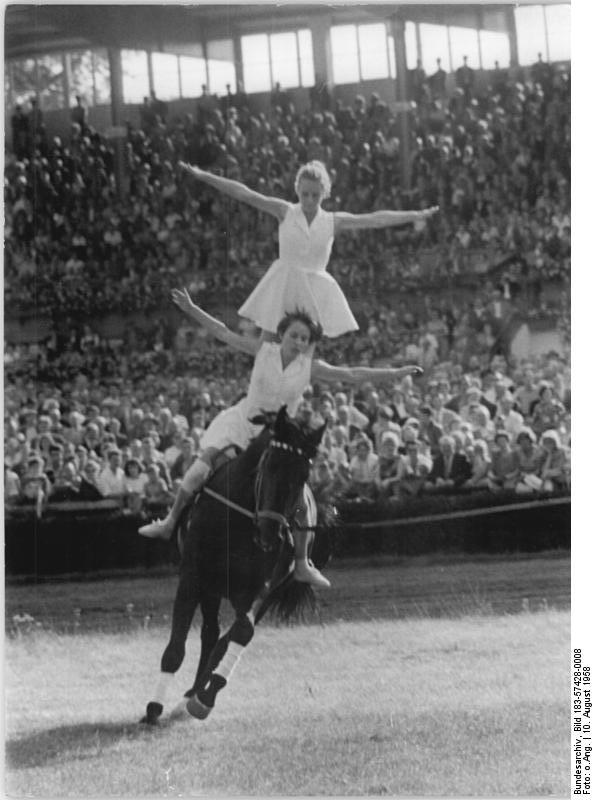
A 1958 photo of a German vaulting team

==== Individual ====
Games	Gold	Silver	Bronze
1920 Antwerp	Daniel Bouckaert; Belgium	Field; France	Louis Finet; Belgium

==== Team ====
Games	Gold	Silver	Bronze
1920 Antwerp	Belgium; Daniel Bouckaert; Louis Finet; Maurice Van Ranst (Note: The IOC medal database shows two more team members van Schauwbroeck and van Cauwenberg, however another major database shows only three medalists, although it also includes two men named Van Schauwenbroeck and Albert Van Cauwenburg in the individual vaulting category.)	France; Field; Salins; Cauchy	Sweden; Carl Green; Anders Mårtensson; Oskar Nilsson

=== Medal table for discontinued disciplines ===
Rank	Nation	Gold	Silver	Bronze	Total
1	Belgium	3	0	1	4
2	France	0	3	1	4
3	Sweden	0	0	1	1
Totals (3 entries)		3	3	3	9

== Statistics ==
=== Athlete medal leaders ===
Athletes who have won at least five medals are listed below.

Athlete	Nation	Gender	Olympics	Gold	Silver	Bronze	Total
Isabell Werth	Germany	Female	1992, 1996, 2000, 2008, 2016, 2020, 2024	8	6	0	14
Reiner Klimke	Germany	Male	1960, 1964, 1968, 1976, 1984, 1988	6	0	2	8
Hans Günter Winkler	Germany	Male	1956, 1960, 1964, 1968, 1972, 1976	5	1	1	7
Charles Pahud de Mortanges	Netherlands	Male	1924, 1928, 1932, 1936	4	1	0	5
Michael Jung	Germany	Male	2012, 2016, 2020, 2024	4	1	0	5
Anky van Grunsven	Netherlands	Female	1988, 1992, 1996, 2000, 2004, 2008, 2012	3	5	1	9
Andrew Hoy	Australia	Male	1984, 1988, 1992, 1996, 2000, 2004, 2012, 2020	3	2	1	6
Charlotte Dujardin	Great Britain	Female	2012, 2016, 2020	3	1	2	6
Michael Plumb	United States	Male	1960, 1964, 1968, 1972, 1976, 1984, 1992	2	4	0	6
Earl Foster Thomson	United States	Male	1932, 1936, 1948	2	3	0	5
Josef Neckermann	Germany	Male	1960, 1964, 1968, 1972	2	2	2	6
André Jousseaume	France	Male	1932, 1936, 1948, 1952, 1956	2	2	1	5
Liselott Linsenhoff	Germany	Female	1956, 1968, 1972	2	2	1	5
Mark Todd	New Zealand	Male	1984, 1988, 1992, 2000, 2008, 2012	2	1	3	6
Christine Stückelberger	Switzerland	Female	1972, 1976, 1984, 1988, 1996, 2000	1	3	1	5
Raimondo D'Inzeo	Italy	Male	1948, 1952, 1956, 1960, 1964, 1968, 1972, 1976	1	2	3	6
Henri Chammartin	Switzerland	Male	1952, 1956, 1960, 1964, 1968	1	2	2	5
Gustav Fischer	Switzerland	Male	1952, 1956, 1960, 1964, 1968	0	3	2	5
Piero D'Inzeo	Italy	Male	1948, 1952, 1956, 1960, 1964, 1968, 1972, 1976	0	2	4	6
