= Equestrian at the 1920 Summer Olympics – Team eventing =

Equestrian at the Olympics

Team eventing at the Games of the VII Olympiad
- Venue: Olympisch Stadion
- Dates: 6–10 September
- Competitors: 23 from 6 nations

Medalists
1st place, gold medalist(s)		Gustaf Dyrsch, Åge Lundström, Helmer Mörner, Georg von Braun; Sweden
2nd place, silver medalist(s)		Carlo Asinari, Giulio Cacciandra, Ettore Caffaratti, Garibaldi Spighi; Italy
3rd place, bronze medalist(s)		Jules Bonvalet, Oswald Lints, Jacques Misonne, Roger Moeremans d'Emaüs; Belgium

The team eventing event was part of the equestrian programme at the 1920 Summer Olympics.

== Results ==
The team score was simply the sum of the best three scores for each nation in the individual eventing competition.

Place	Team	Ind. place	Score	Total
Final
Gold	Sweden			5057.50
Gold	Helmer Mörner and Germania	1	1775.00	5057.50
Gold	Åge Lundström and Ysra	2	1738.75	5057.50
Gold	Georg von Braun and Diana	8	1543.75	5057.50
Gold	Gustaf Dyrsch and Salamis	-	DNF	5057.50
Silver	Italy			4735.00
Silver	Ettore Caffaratti and Caniche	3	1733.75	4735.00
Silver	Garibaldi Spighi and Otello	5	1647.50	4735.00
Silver	Giulio Cacciandra and Facetto	14	1353.75	4735.00
Silver	Carlo Asinari and Savari	19	1245.00	4735.00
Bronze	Belgium			4560.00
Bronze	Roger Moeremans d'Emaüs and Sweet Girl	4	1652.50	4560.00
Bronze	Oswald Lints and Martha	10	1515.00	4560.00
Bronze	Jules Bonvalet and Weppelghem	12	1392.50	4560.00
Bronze	Jacques Misonne and Gaucho	17	1282.50	4560.00
4	United States			4477.50
4	Harry Chamberlin and Nigra	6	1568.75	4477.50
4	William West and Black Boy	7	1558.75	4477.50
4	John Burke Barry and Raven	16	1350.00	4477.50
4	Sloan Doak and Deceive	-	DNF	4477.50
—	Norway			—
—	Knut Gysler and Emden	9	1537.50	—
—	Eugen Johansen and Nökken	11	1428.75	—
—	Bjørn Bjørnseth and Lydia	-	DNF	—
—	France			—
—	Edouard Saint-Poulof and Josette	13	1387.50	—
—	Camille de Sartiges and Jehova	15	1352.50	—
—	Jules de Vregille and Grand Manitou	-	DNF	—

== Sources ==
- Belgium Olympic Committee (1957). Olympic Games Antwerp 1920: Official Report (in French).
- Wudarski, Pawel (1999). "Wyniki Igrzysk Olimpijskich" (in Polish). Archived from the original on 16 February 2009.
