= Equestrian at the 1920 Summer Olympics – Individual eventing =

Equestrian at the Olympics

Individual eventing at the Games of the VII Olympiad
- Venue: Olympisch Stadion
- Dates: 6–10 September
- Competitors: 25 from 8 nations

Medalists
1st place, gold medalist(s)		Helmer Mörner	Sweden
2nd place, silver medalist(s)		Åge Lundström	Sweden
3rd place, bronze medalist(s)		Ettore Caffaratti	Italy

The individual eventing event was part of the equestrian programme at the 1920 Summer Olympics.

== Results ==
Place	Equestrian	Score
1	Helmer Mörner and Germania (SWE)	1775.00
2	Åge Lundström and Ysra (SWE)	1738.75
3	Ettore Caffaratti and Caniche (ITA)	1733.75
4	Roger Moeremans d'Emaüs and Sweet Girl (BEL)	1652.50
5	Garibaldi Spighi and Otello (ITA)	1647.50
6	Harry Chamberlin and Nigra (USA)	1568.75
7	William West and Black Boy (USA)	1558.75
8	Georg von Braun and Diana (SWE)	1543.75
9	Knut Gysler and Emden (NOR)	1537.50
10	Oswald Lints and Martha (BEL)	1515.00
11	Eugen Johansen and Nökken (NOR)	1428.75
12	Jules Bonvalet and Weppelghem (BEL)	1392.50
13	Édouard Saint-Poulof and Josette (FRA)	1387.50
14	Giulio Cacciandra and Facetto (ITA)	1353.75
15	Camille de Sartiges and Jehova (FRA)	1352.50
16	John Burke Barry and Raven (USA)	1350.00
17	Oskar Wilkman and Meno (FIN)	1282.50
17	Jacques Misonne and Gaucho (BEL)	1282.50
19	Carlo Asinari and Savari (ITA)	1245.00
20	Idzard Sirtema and Good Shot (NED)	1035.00
—	Joseph de Vrégille and Grand Manitou (FRA)	DNF
—	Bjørn Bjørnseth and Lydia (NOR)	DNF
—	Gustaf Dyrsch and Salamis (SWE)	DNF
—	Sloan Doak and Deceive (USA)	DNF
—	Emmanuel Vidart and Maxime (FRA)	DNF

== Sources ==
- Belgium Olympic Committee (1957). Olympic Games Antwerp 1920: Official Report (in French).
- Wudarski, Pawel (1999). "Wyniki Igrzysk Olimpijskich" (in Polish). Archived from the original on 16 February 2009.
