= Equestrian events at the 1920 Summer Olympics =

Equestrian at the Games of the VII Olympiad
- Venue: Olympisch Stadion
- Dates: 6–12 September 1920
- No. of events: 7
- Competitors: 89 from 8 nations

The equestrian events at the 1920 Summer Olympics in Antwerp included eventing, show jumping, vaulting and dressage. The competitions were held from 6 to 12 September 1920. Although 89 riders were competing, many rode in more than one event, with 87 entries total (45 jumping, 17 dressage, 25 eventing). Vaulting was also held, its one appearance at an Olympic Games, with only Belgium, France and Sweden fielding teams.

== Disciplines ==
=== Dressage ===
The requirements for the dressage test remained the same as for the 1912 Games. Team dressage medals were not distributed.

=== Show jumping ===
The show jumping competition held both its individual and team competitions on the same day, and riders in the team event could not compete for an individual medal. Therefore, 10 riders total (5 teams and 5 individual) could be sent for the jumping competition, although only Italy and Sweden were able to field that many riders.

=== Eventing ===
The eventing competition removed the dressage test for the 1920 Games, and replaced it with a second roads and tracks phase that was 20 kilometres (12 mi) in length. The cross-country test proved to be challenging, with 12 of the 25 horses contesting the course finishing with time faults, and 13 finishing with faults at obstacles.

== Medal summary ==
| Games | Gold | Silver | Bronze |
|---|---|---|---|
| Individual dressage | Janne Lundblad on Uno; Sweden | Bertil Sandström on Sabel; Sweden | Hans von Rosen on Running Sister; Sweden |
| Individual eventing | Helmer Mörner on Germania; Sweden | Åge Lundström on Ysra; Sweden | Ettore Caffaratti on Caniche; Italy |
| Team eventing | Sweden; Helmer Mörner and Germania; Åge Lundström and Ysra; Georg von Braun and Diana; Gustaf Dyrsch and Salamis | Italy; Ettore Caffaratti and Caniche; Garibaldi Spighi and Otello; Giulio Cacciandra and Facetto; Carlo Asinari and Savari | Belgium; Roger Moeremans d'Emaüs and Sweet Girl; Oswald Lints and Martha; Jules Bonvalet and Weppelghem; Jacques Misonne and Gaucho |
| Individual jumping | Tommaso Lequio di Assaba on Trebecco; Italy | Alessandro Valerio on Cento; Italy | Carl Gustaf Lewenhaupt on Mon Coeur; Sweden |
| Team jumping | Sweden; Claës König and Tresor; Hans von Rosen and Poor Boy; Daniel Norling and Eros II; Frank Martin and Kohort | Belgium; Henri Laame and Biscuit; André Coumans and Lisette; Herman de Gaiffier d'Hestroy and Miss; Herman d'Oultromont and Lord Kitchener | Italy; Ettore Caffaratti and Traditore; Alessandro Alvisi and Raggio di Sole; Giulio Cacciandra and Fortunello; Carlo Asinari and Varone |
| Individual vaulting | Daniel Bouckaert; Belgium | Field; France | Louis Finet; Belgium |
| Team vaulting | Belgium; Daniel Bouckaert; Louis Finet; Maurice Van Ranst | France; Field; Salins; Cauchy | Sweden; Carl Green; Anders Mårtensson; Oskar Nilsson |

== Participating nations ==
A total of 89 riders from 8 nations competed at the Antwerp Games:

- Belgium (18)
- Finland (1)
- France (24)
- Italy (10)
- Netherlands (1)
- Norway (5)
- Sweden (22)
- United States (8)

== Medal table ==
| Rank | Nation | Gold | Silver | Bronze | Total |
|---|---|---|---|---|---|
| 1 | Sweden | 4 | 2 | 3 | 9 |
| 2 | Belgium | 2 | 1 | 2 | 5 |
| 3 | Italy | 1 | 2 | 2 | 5 |
| 4 | France | 0 | 2 | 0 | 2 |
| Totals (4 entries) | | 7 | 7 | 7 | 21 |

== Officials ==
Appointment of officials was as follows:

Jumping

- (Belgium) Lt. Gen. Joostens (Ground Jury President)
- (Sweden) Col. Baron von Essen (Ground Jury Member)
- (United States) Col. Walter C. Short (Ground Jury Member)
- (France) Baron Nivière (Ground Jury Member)
- (Belgium) Col. Viscount Jolly (Ground Jury Member)
- (Norway) Maj. Chr. Fr. Michelet (Ground Jury Member)
- (Italy) Capt. Emanuelle di Pralermo (Ground Jury Member)

Eventing

- (Belgium) Lt. Gen. Joostens (Ground Jury President)
- (Sweden) Col. Baron von Essen (Ground Jury Member)
- (Belgium) Gen. Maj. Du Roy de Blicquy (Ground Jury Member)
- (Finland) Col. Aejmelaens (Ground Jury Member)
- (United States) Col. Walter C. Short (Ground Jury Member)
- (France) Cmdt. P.E. Haentjens (Ground Jury Member)
- (Norway) Maj. Chr. Fr. Michelet (Ground Jury Member)
- (Italy) Capt. Emanuelle di Pralermo (Ground Jury Member)
