= Vidart =

Vidart is a surname. Notable people with the surname include:

- Camille Vidart (1854–1930), Swiss educator, translator, and women's rights activist and pacifist.
- Daniel Vidart (1920–2019), Uruguayan anthropologist, writer, and historian.
- Emmanuel Vidart (1882–1944), French equestrian.
