= La Fair =

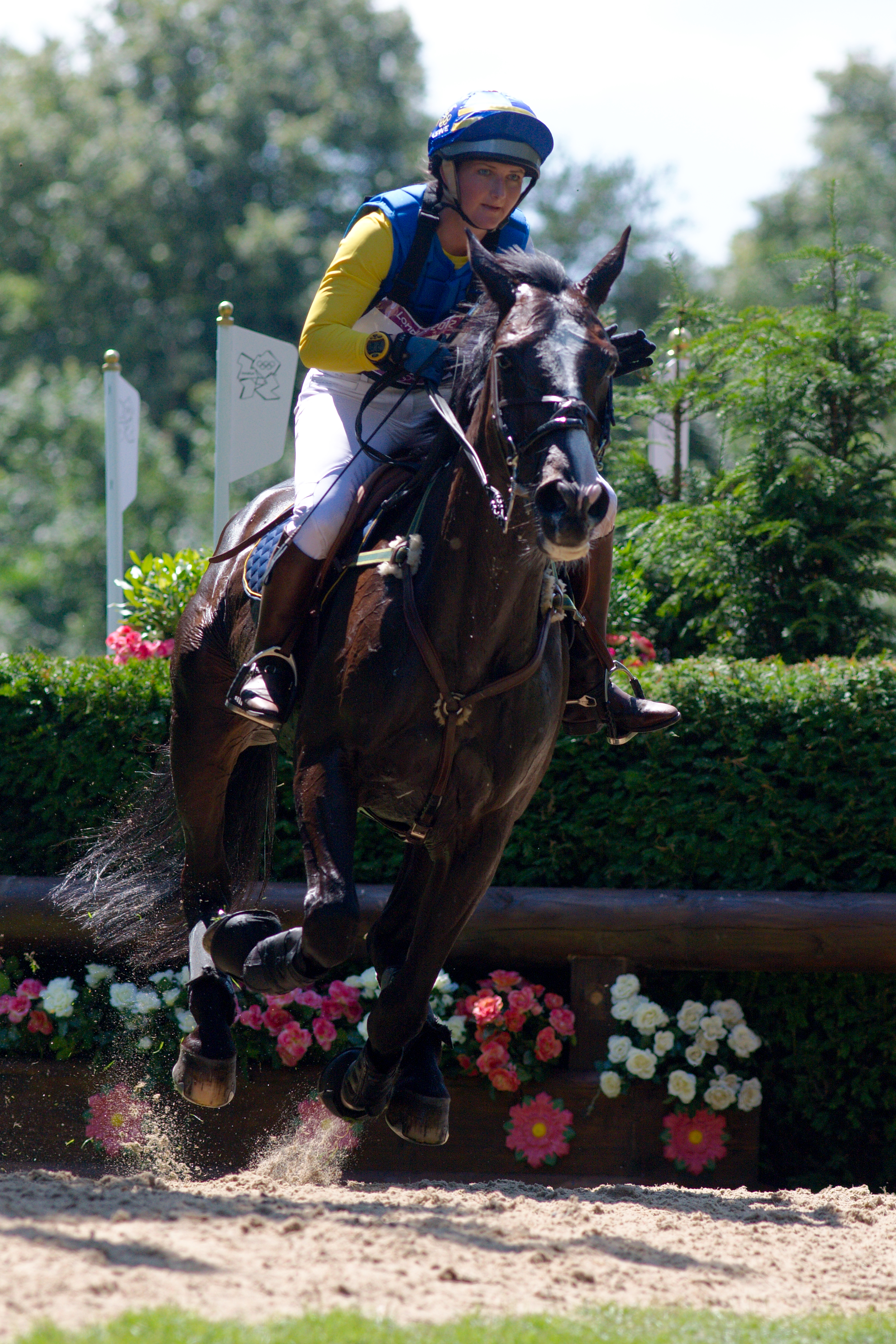
Linda Algotsson and La Fair competes in the Summer Olympics in London

La Fair (1997–2014) was a dark brown mare horse who competed in the eventing competition at the 2012 Summer Olympics and the 2013 European Equestrian championships. In both cases, she was ridden by Linda Algotsson. La Fair made 28 starts in international competitions with Algotsson during her career. Her daughter, Wega, competed on the same 4th-placed team at the 2012 Summer Olympics.
