= Oswald Lints =

Belgian equestrian (1895–1970)

Personal information
- Born: 18 April 1895 Leuven, Belgium
- Died: 8 June 1970 (aged 75) Namur, Belgium
Medal record
Equestrian
Olympic Games
Representing Belgium
Bronze medal – third place	1920 Antwerp	Eventing, Team

Oswald Guillaume Henri Lints (18 April 1895 – 8 June 1970) was a Belgian equestrian. He won a bronze medal in team eventing at the 1920 Summer Olympics in Antwerp, together with Roger Moeremans d'Emaüs, Jules Bonvalet and Jacques Misonne, and placed 10th in individual eventing.
