= Detlow von Braun =

Swedish sailor

Karl Axel Georg Detlow von Braun (22 March 1912 – 13 July 1999) was a Swedish Olympic sailor. In the 1936 Summer Olympics, he sailed with the 8-metre Ilderim, helmed by Tore Holm, and finished 4th. He was the son of Georg von Braun.
