= Idzard Sirtema =

Dutch equestrian

Personal information
- Full name: Idzard Louis Douwe baron Sirtema van Grovestins
- Nationality: Dutch
- Born: 22 January 1893; The Hague, Netherlands
- Died: 6 October 1983 (aged 90); Brummen, Netherlands

Sport
- Sport: Equestrian

Idzard Louis Douwe Sirtema van Grovestins (22 January 1893 – 6 October 1983) was a Dutch equestrian. He competed in the individual eventing event at the 1920 Summer Olympics.
