= Eugen Johansen =

Norwegian equestrian (1892–1973)

Olympic medal record

Men's Equestrian
| Silver medal – second place | 1928 Amsterdam | Team eventing |

Wilhelm Eugen Johansen (1 February 1892 – 31 December 1973) was a Norwegian horse rider who competed in the 1920 Summer Olympics, in the 1928 Summer Olympics, and in the 1936 Summer Olympics.

In 1920, he and his horse Nökken finished eleventh in the individual eventing. The Norwegian eventing team did not finish the team eventing competition because only two riders finished the individual competition. Johnsen and Nökken also participated in the individual jumping event and finished 13th.

Eight years later, he and his horse Baby won the silver medal as members of the Norwegian eventing team in the team eventing competition after finishing 27th in the individual eventing.

In 1936, he and his horse Sorte Mand finished seventh as part of the Norwegian dressage team in the team dressage competition, after finishing 20th in the individual dressage event.

Johansen held the rank of Rittmester in the Norwegian Army, and fought with the 2nd Division in the 1940 Norwegian Campaign. In 1943 he was arrested by the Germans and sent as a prisoner of war to Germany, being released at the end of the Second World War.
