= Joseph de Vrégille =

French equestrian

Joseph de Vregille
Personal information
- Nationality: French
- Born: 31 January 1878; Reyrieux, France
- Died: 30 June 1949 (aged 71); Vregille, France

Sport
- Sport: Equestrian

Joseph Courlet de Vregille (31 January 1878 – 30 June 1949) was a French equestrian. He competed in two events at the 1920 Summer Olympics.
