= Sloan Doak =

American equestrian

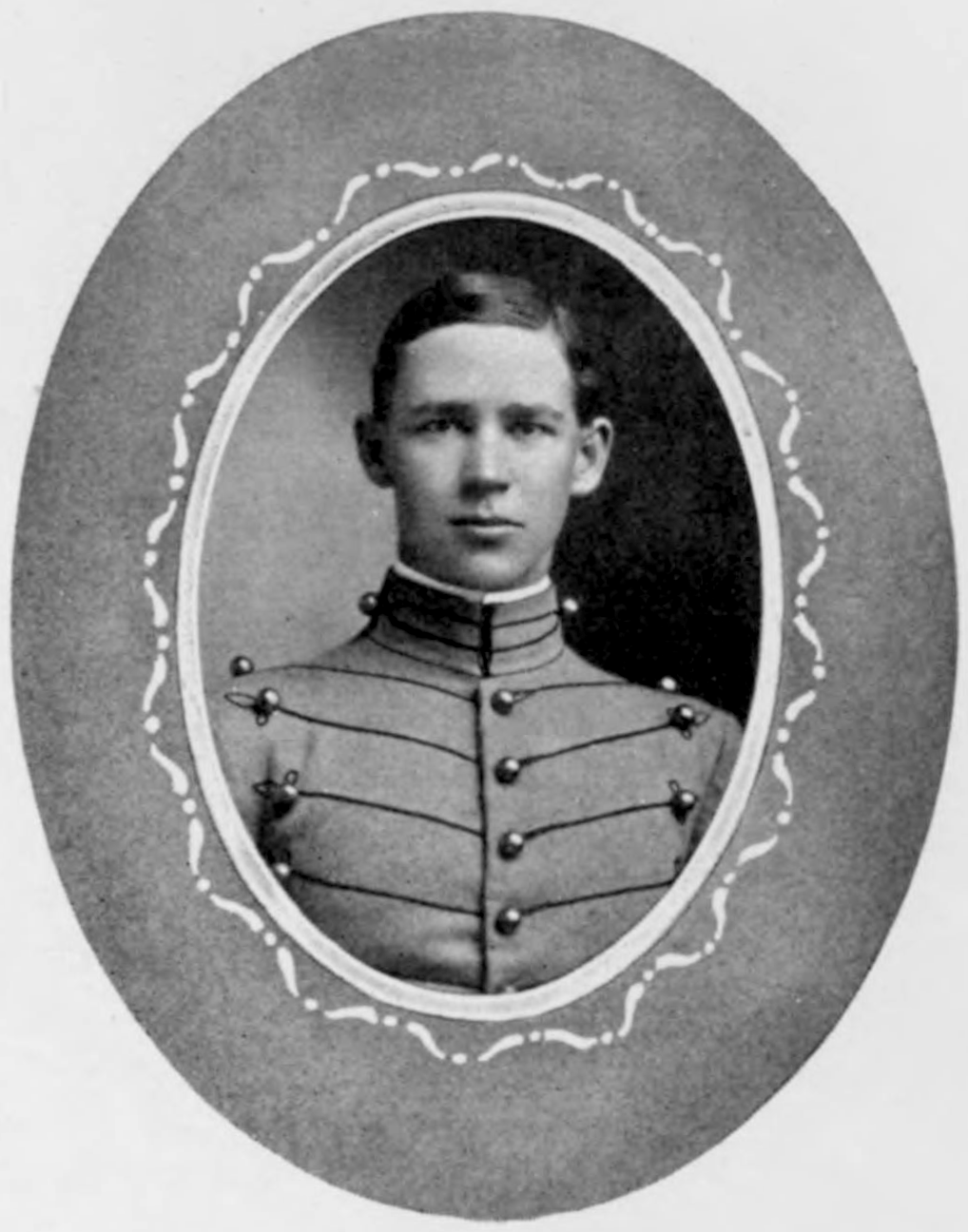
- At West Point in 1907

Medal record

Men's Equestrian

Representing the United States

Olympic Games
Bronze medal – third place	1924 Paris	Individual eventing

Sloan Doak (January 28, 1886 – August 10, 1965) was an American horse rider who competed in three Summer Olympic Games in 1920, 1924 and 1928, winning the bronze medal in eventing in 1924.

== Career ==
In 1920 he and his horse Singlen finished 14th in the individual dressage competition. He also participated in the individual eventing with his horse Deceive, but they did not finish the competition. The American eventing team finished fourth in the team eventing. Doak, this time with his horse Rabbit Red, was also a member of the American jumping team which finished fourth in the team jumping event.

Four years later he and his horse Pathfinder won the bronze medal in the individual eventing. The American eventing team did not finish the team eventing competition, because only two riders were able to finish the individual competition. In the individual jumping event he finished 29th with his horse Joffre. But again the American team did not finish the team jumping competition, because only two riders were able to finish the individual competition.

Doak finally competed at the Olympics at the 1928 Amsterdam Games. He and his horse Misty Morn finished 17th in the Individual eventing. The American eventing team once again did not finish the team eventing competition, because only two riders finished the individual competition.

== Course design ==
Along with fellow Olympic rider John Burke Barry, Doak designed the show jumping course for the 1932 Summer Olympics. The course was "brutally difficult" and resulted in the elimination of six of the 11 riders.
