= Édouard Saint-Poulof =

French equestrian

Personal information
- Nationality: French
- Born: 4 April 1877 Rambouillet, France
- Died: 8 October 1934 (aged 57)

Sport
- Sport: Equestrian

Édouard Saint-Poulof (4 April 1877 – 8 October 1934) was a French equestrian. He competed in two events at the 1920 Summer Olympics.
