= Emmanuel Vidart =

French equestrian

Personal information
- Full name: Emmanuel Eugene Paul Edouard Vidart
- Nationality: French
- Born: 9 April 1882; Divonne-les-Bains, France
- Died: 13 January 1944 (aged 61); Oran, Algeria

Sport
- Sport: Equestrian

Emmanuel Eugene Paul Édouard Vidart (9 April 1882 – 13 January 1944) was a French equestrian. He competed in the individual eventing event at the 1920 Summer Olympics. He died on active service during World War II.
