= Janne Lundblad =

Swedish equestrian (1887–1940)

Personal information
- Born: 11 April 1887 Linköping, Sweden
- Died: 24 November 1940 (aged 53)
Medal record
Men's Equestrian
Representing Sweden
Olympic Games
Gold medal – first place	1920 Antwerp	Individual dressage
Silver medal – second place	1928 Amsterdam	Team dressage

Janne Lundblad (11 April 1887 – 24 November 1940) was a Swedish Army officer and horse rider who competed in the 1920 Summer Olympics and in the 1928 Summer Olympics. In 1920, he and his horse Uno won the gold medal in the individual dressage.

Eight years later, he won the silver medal with the Swedish dressage team. This time with his horse Blackmar. They also competed in the individual dressage event and finished fourth.

Lundblad was captain in the Swedish Army.
