= William West (equestrian) =

American equestrian

Personal information
- Born: July 15, 1887 Whitesville, Georgia, United States
- Died: September 15, 1953 (aged 66) Fairlington, Virginia, United States

Sport
- Sport: Equestrian

William West (July 15, 1887 – September 15, 1953) was an American equestrian. He competed in three events at the 1920 Summer Olympics.
