= HH Azur =

- Breed: Belgian Warmblood
- Discipline: Show jumping
- Sire: Thunder Vd Zuuthoeve
- Dam: Sion Vd Zuuthoeve
- Sex: Mare
- Foaled: 2006

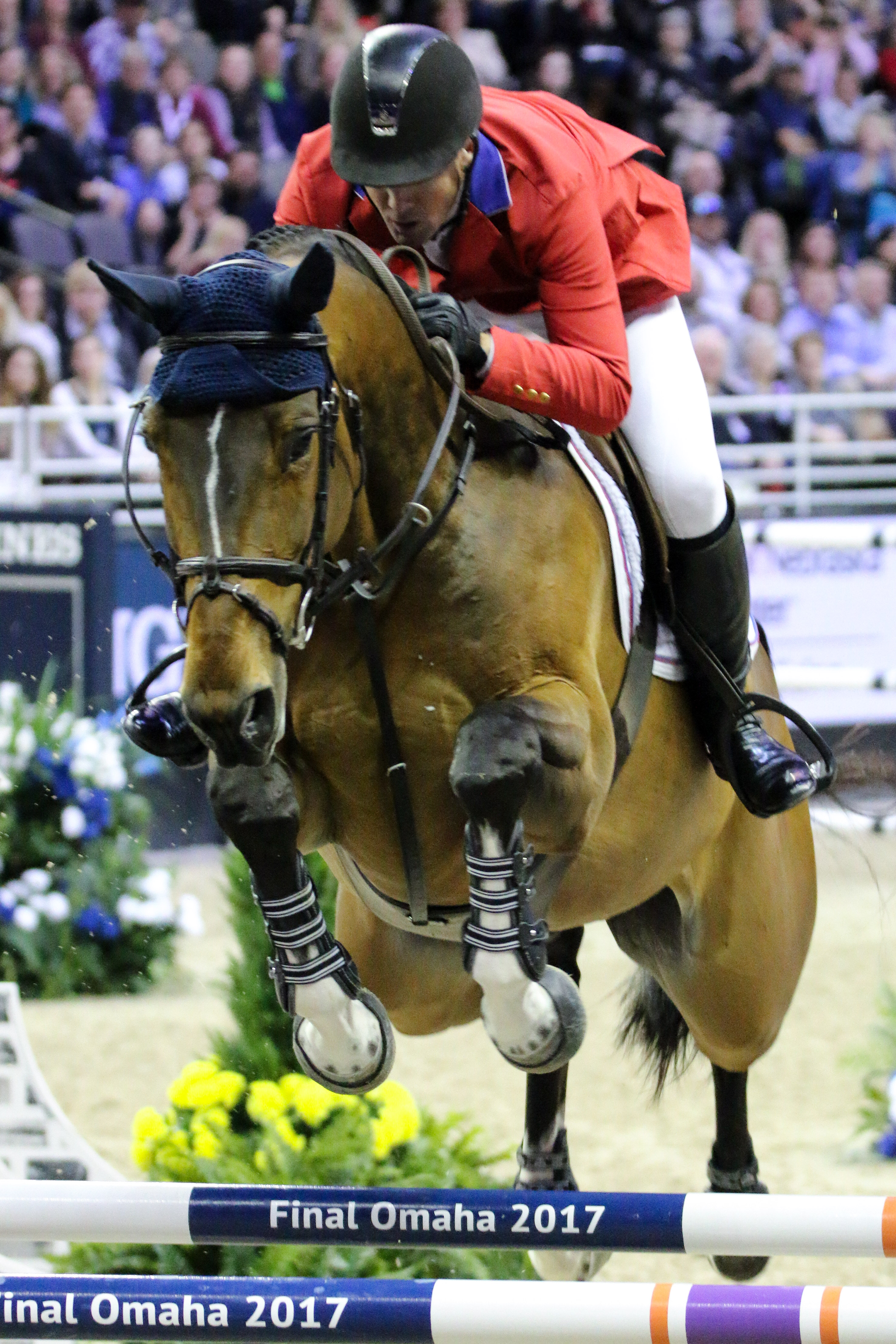
HH Azur

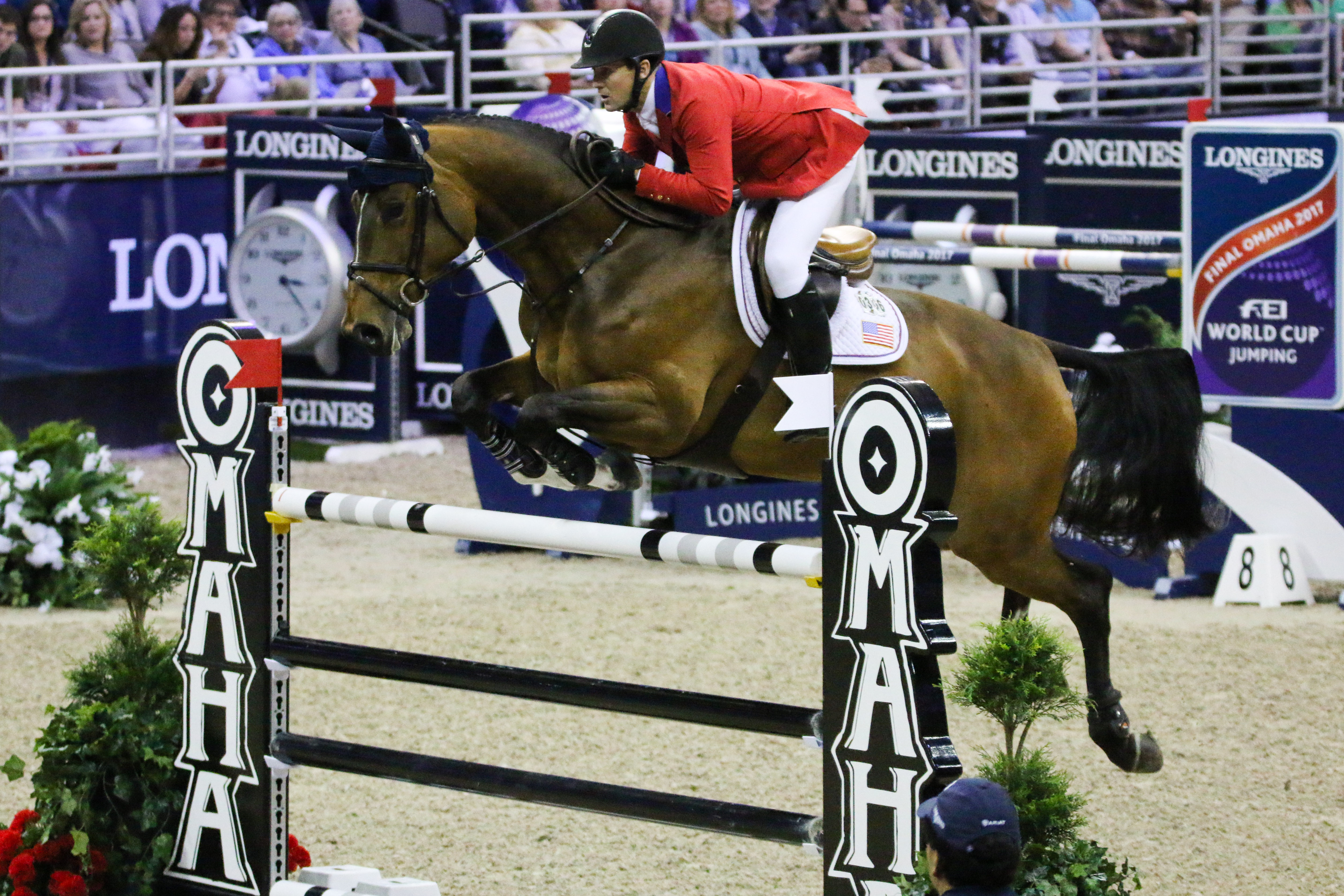
HH Azur and McLain Ward in the 2017 FEI World Cup Jumping Finals

HH Azur is a horse ridden by McLain Ward. The duo competed at the Olympic Games in Rio de Janeiro in August 2016 and earned 9th place individually as well as earning a team silver medal. The pair also went on to win the 2017 Longines FEI World Cup Jumping Final and have won many other notable classes.

== Life ==
HH Azur was foaled in 2006. She is a Belgian Warmblood mare sired by Thunder Van De Zuuthoeve and out of Sion Van De Zuuthoeve; her damsire is Sir Lui. She is owned by Double H Farm in partnership with François Mathy. Along with being a talented jumper, "Annie" also has a friendly personality. According to her grooms, she is friendly and will come say hello upon entering the barn. She is cared for by a team of grooms including Lee McKeever, Chris Cook, Sean Kissane, Kirsty and Kelly Massari.

Originally named Azur Du Garden, Azur was ridden by Pedro Nolasco up to the international level before being bought by François Mathy and his rider Diego Perez Bilbao took over the ride, who developed her up to 1.45m classes. Although initially passing up on HH Azur as a five-year-old, Ward's sponsor, Double H Farm, purchased half of her in December 2014, giving Ward the ride. In their first year together, Ward and Annie won many major classes all over North America. The following year, the pair competed in their first championship together at the 2016 Olympic Games in Rio de Janeiro placing 9th individually and team silver. HH Azur jumped completely cleanly at the 2017 World Cup Jumping Finals in Omaha, Nebraska to take the championship for the first time in Ward's career. HH Azur jumped only clear rounds in team competition in 2017. She also jumped at the 2018 World Cup Finals in Paris where she finished 4th overall. HH Azur struggled with some injuries in 2019, but won the Lugano Diamonds Grand Prix in Wellington, Florida in February 2020, shortly before the horse show circuit was paused due to the COVID-19 pandemic.

HH Azur is shown in a twisted snaffle bit. Although quiet on the flat, HH Azur can light up to the jumps. She has enough energy that can carry her through a championship format such as the Olympics. She tends to be calm and not phased and is easy to work with in the barn.

== Major results ==
HH Azur Major Results
Year	Result	Competition	Rating	Show	Location
2020	1	$401,000 Lugano Diamonds Grand Prix	CSI5*	Winter Equestrian Festival	Wellington, FL (USA)
2019	1	Canadian Utilities Cup 1.55m	CSI5*	Spruce Meadows	Calgary, AB (CAN)
2019	1	$250,000 Sapphire Devon Grand Prix	CSI4*	Devon Horse Show	Devon, PA (USA)
2019	1	$500,000 Rolex Grand Prix	CSI5*	Winter Equestrian Festival	Wellington, FL (USA)
2018	1	$132,000 Equinimity WEF Challenge Cup	CSI5*	Winter Equestrian Festival	Wellington, FL (USA)
2017	Gold	Longines FEI World Cup Jumping Final 2017		FEI World Cup Finals	Omaha, Nebraska(USA)
2017	1	$380,000 Suncast Grand Prix	CSI5*	Winter Equestrian Festival	Wellington, FL (USA)
2016	9	Show Jumping Individual Competition		The 2016 Summer Olympics	Rio de Janeiro (BRZ)
2016	Silver	Show Jumping Team Competition		The 2016 Summer Olympics	Rio de Janeiro (BRZ)
2016	1	€200,000 Loro Piana Grand Prix City of Rome	CSIO5*	Rome Horse Show	Rome (ITA)
2016	1	$380,000 Suncast Grand Prix	CSIO5*	Winter Equestrian Festival	Wellington, FL (USA)
2015	1	Douglas Elliman Grand Prix	CSIO5*	The Hampton Classic	East Hampton, NY (USA)
2015	2	$100,000 1.50m Final	CSIO5*	Winter Equestrian Festival	Wellington, FL (USA)
