= Wega (horse) =

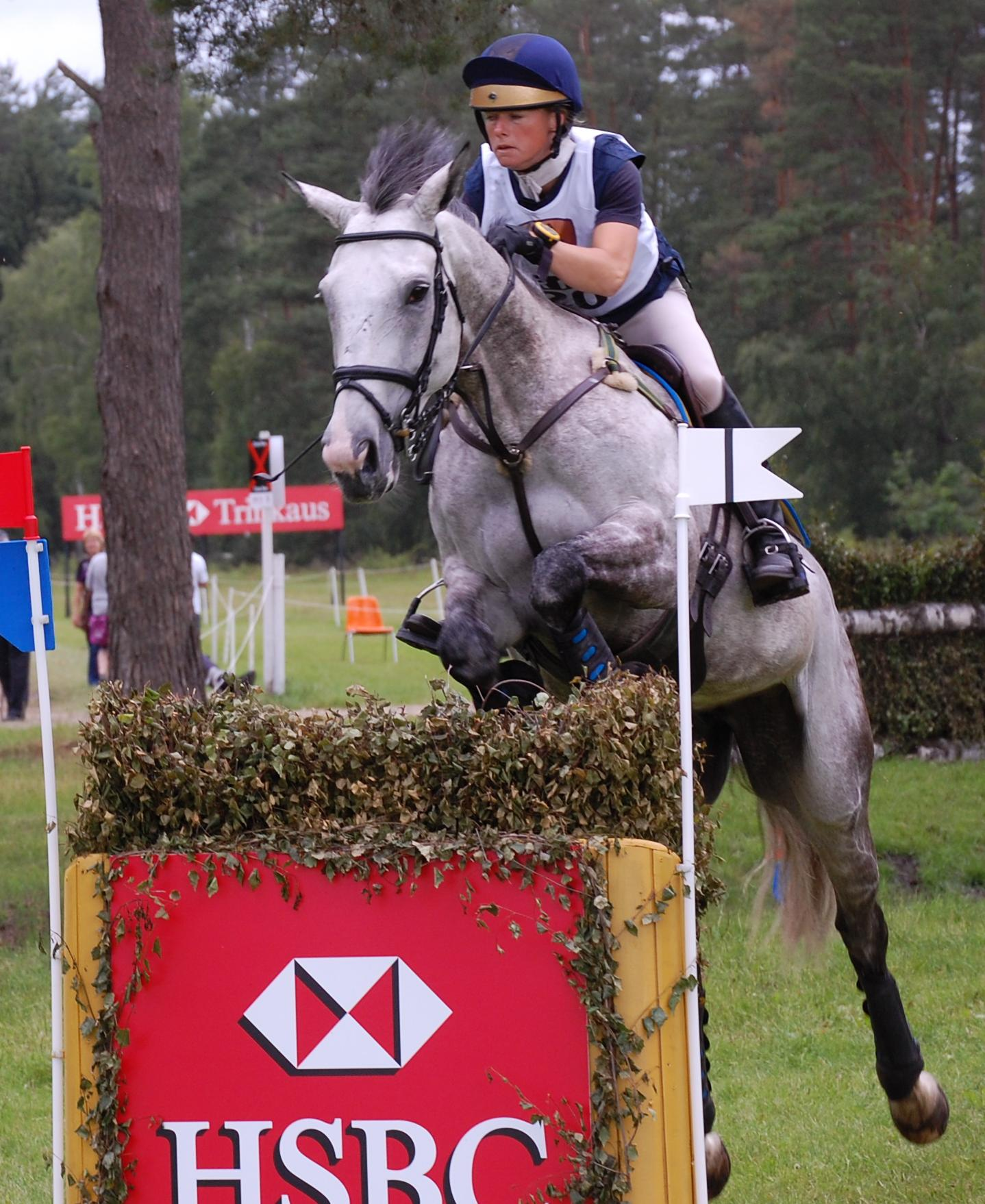
Wega and Sara Algotsson-Ostholt in 2011

Wega (born 2001) is a Swedish Warmblood mare who won the individual silver medal at the eventing competition at the 2012 Summer Olympics in London, with Sara Algotsson Ostholt as the rider. Wega was by the stallion Irco Mena, and out of La Fair (by the Swedish stallion Labrador), who was on the 4th place-finishing 2012 Olympic team with her daughter. Wega was also a member of the Swedish team at the 2011 European Championships.
