= Camille de Sartiges =

French equestrian

Personal information
- Nationality: French
- Born: 15 June 1888 Sourniac, France
- Died: 11 May 1971 (aged 82) Paris, France

Sport
- Sport: Equestrian

Camille de Sartiges (15 June 1888 – 11 May 1971) was a French equestrian. He competed at the 1920 Summer Olympics and the 1924 Summer Olympics.
