= Ettore Caffaratti =

Italian horse rider (1886–1969)

Ettore Caffaritti
- Born: 12 May 1886; Pinerolo, Kingdom of Italy
- Died: 8 January 1969 (aged 82); Milan, Italy
- Military career
- Allegiance: Kingdom of Italy
- Branch: Royal Italian Army
- Rank: Generale di Brigata
- Commands: 22nd Colonial Division
- Conflicts: World War I World War II: East Africa Campaign
- Awards: Silver Medal of Military Valor

Olympic medal record

Representing Italy

Men's Equestrian
Silver medal – second place	1920 Antwerp	Team eventing
Bronze medal – third place	1920 Antwerp	Individual eventing
Bronze medal – third place	1920 Antwerp	Team jumping

Ettore Caffaratti (12 May 1886 – 8 January 1969) was an Italian horse rider who competed in the 1920 Summer Olympics. He also served as a general in the Royal Italian Army during World War II.

== Biography ==
In 1920 he and his horse Caniche won the silver medal in the team eventing and the bronze medal in the individual eventing. He also won the bronze medal in the team show jumping competition with his horse Tradittore.
