= Helmer Mörner =

Swedish equestrian

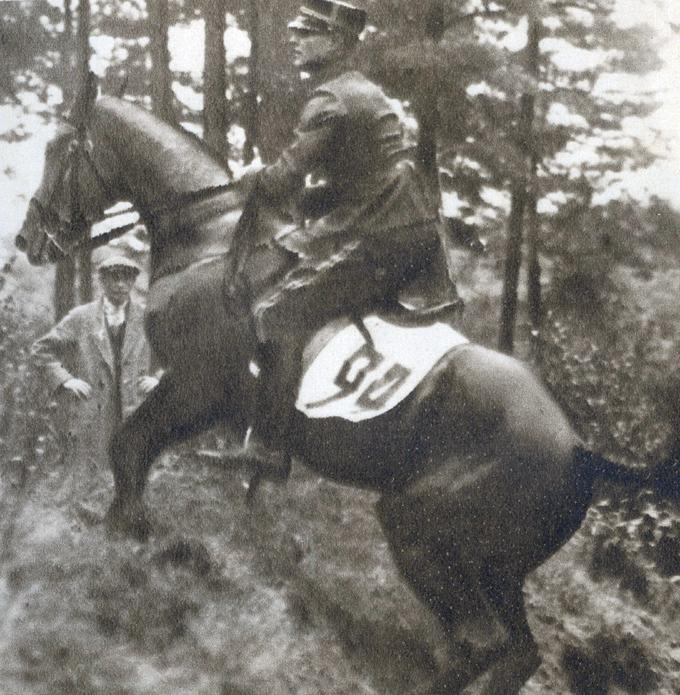
- Born: Helmer Fredrik Gustafsson Mörner; 8 May 1895; Landskrona, Sweden
- Died: 5 January 1962 (aged 66)
- Military career
- Branch: Swedish Army
- Service years: 1915–1947
- Rank: Major

Olympic medal record

Men's Equestrian
Gold medal – first place	1920 Antwerp	Individual eventing
Gold medal – first place	1920 Antwerp	Team eventing

Helmer Fredrik Gustafsson Mörner (8 May 1895 – 5 January 1962), also known as Graf Helmer Morner, was a Swedish horse rider, who won individual and team gold medals in eventing at the 1920 Summer Olympics.

In 1914 Mörner enlisted to the Wendes Artillery Regiment (A 3) in Kristianstad, and served there until 1947 when he became professor at the Uppsala University. He left no descendants after his death.

Mörner was preparing for the 1920 Olympics with a Russian horse, but it had to be replaced in the last moment due to a leg injury. The substitute horse was known as Germania, but it was renamed to Geria to avoid bringing up the name of Germany at the first Games after World War I.
