= Bjørn Bjørnseth =

Norwegian equestrian

Personal information
- Nationality: Norwegian
- Born: 28 August 1888; Oslo, Norway
- Died: 1 September 1976 (aged 88); Ullensaker, Norway

Sport
- Sport: Equestrian

Bjørn Bjørnseth (28 August 1888 – 1 September 1976) was a Norwegian equestrian. He competed at the 1920 Summer Olympics and the 1936 Summer Olympics.
