= Giulio Cacciandra =

Italian equestrian

Olympic medal record

Representing Italy

Men's Equestrian
Silver medal – second place	1920 Antwerp	Team eventing
Bronze medal – third place	1920 Antwerp	Team jumping

Giulio Cacciandra (15 July 1884 – 28 January 1971) was an Italian horse rider who competed in the 1920 Summer Olympics. In 1920, he and his horse Facetto won the silver medal in the team eventing after finishing 14th in the individual eventing competition. He also won the bronze with his horse Fortunello in the team jumping event. Giulio Cacciandra was a cavalry general. At the 1920 Olympics in Antwerp, he took part in the three-day event on Facetto and in the jumping on Fortunello, winning medals with the Italian team in both events: silver in eventing and bronze in jumping. He later founded the Società Ippica, a riding school in his hometown of Alessandrina. [^{2}]
