= John Burke Barry =

American equestrian

Personal information
- Born: January 27, 1880 Gallatin, Texas, United States
- Died: January 10, 1937 (aged 56) Sturgis, South Dakota, United States

Sport
- Sport: Equestrian

John Burke Barry (January 27, 1880 – January 10, 1937) was an American equestrian. He competed at the 1920 Summer Olympics and the 1924 Summer Olympics.

Along with fellow Olympic rider Sloan Doak, Barry designed the show jumping course for the 1932 Summer Olympics. The course was "brutally difficult" and resulted in the elimination of six of the 11 riders.
