= Garibaldi Spighi =

Italian equestrian

Olympic medal record

Men's Equestrian
Silver medal – second place	1920 Antwerp	Team eventing

Garibaldi Spighi (11 June 1891 – 9 July 1978) was an Italian horse rider who competed in the 1920 Summer Olympics. In 1920 he and his horse Otello won the silver medal in the team eventing after finishing fifth in the individual eventing competition. He also finished tenth with his horse Virginia in the individual jumping event.
