= Frank Martin (equestrian) =

Swedish equestrian

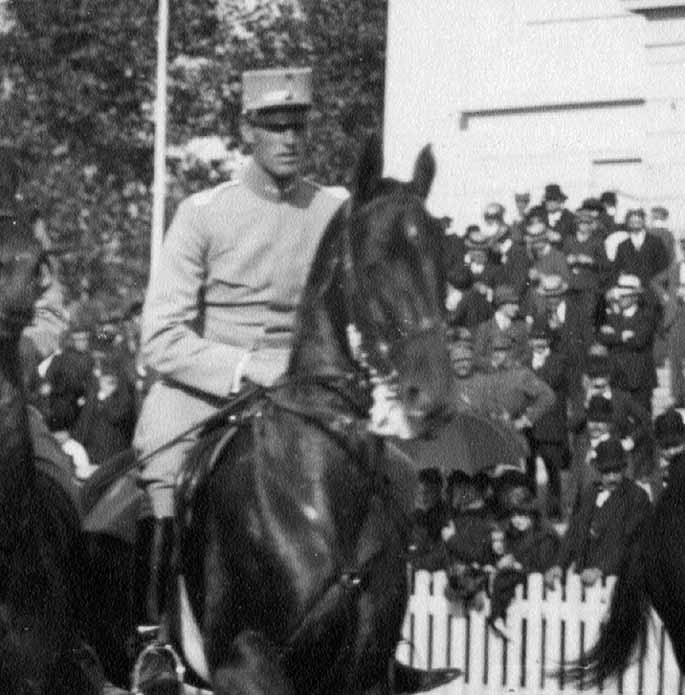
- Martin at the 1920 Olympics

Personal information
- Born: 30 December 1885 Stockholm, Sweden
- Died: 28 August 1962 (aged 76) Danderyd, Stockholm, Sweden

Sport
- Sport: Horse riding
- Club: K2 IF, Stockholm

Frank Hugo Martin (30 December 1885 – 28 August 1962) was a Swedish horse rider who competed in the 1920 Summer Olympics. He and his horse Kohort were part of the Swedish equestrian team that won the gold medal in jumping; however, Martin did not receive a medal because only three best performers from each team were counted, while he placed fourth.

In 1904 Martin entered the Royal War Academy and graduated in 1906, becoming a lieutenant with the dragoons of the King's Own Regiment. He later continued his military studies at the Strömsholm Riding School, at the War College, at the French Riding School in Saumur (1923), and at the Shooting School in Rosersberg (1925). In parallel he taught military science at the Strömsholm Riding School in 1915–1919. In 1928 he was promoted to captain and squadron leader of the King's Own Mounted Regiment. The same year he started working for the newspaper Svenska Dagbladet.
