= Bertil Sandström =

Swedish equestrian (1887–1964)

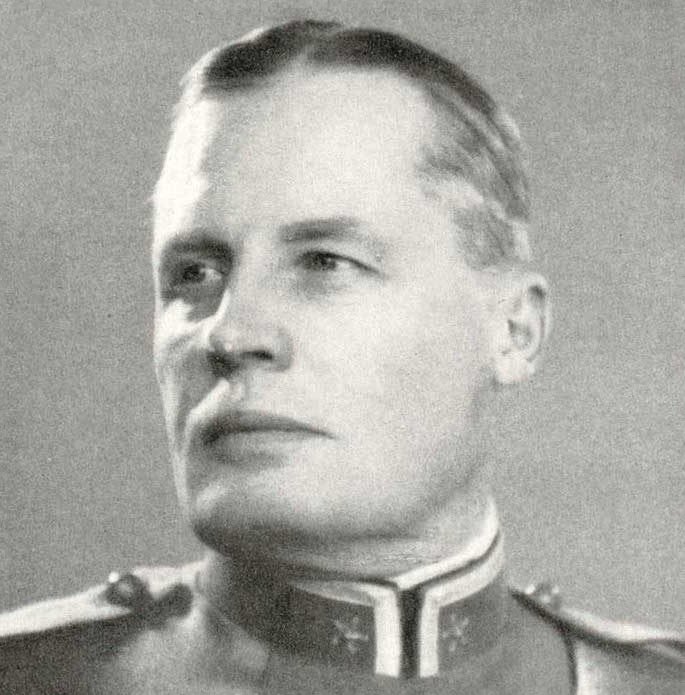
- Bertil Sandström in the 1920's
- Born: Karl Bertil Sandström; 25 November 1887; Gävle, Sweden
- Died: 1 December 1964 (aged 77); Solna, Sweden
- Military career
- Branch: Swedish Army
- Service years: 1912–1938
- Rank: Major
- Units: Småland Hussar Regiment (1912–28); Life Regiment Hussars (1928–?)

Olympic medal record

Men's Equestrian
| Silver medal – second place | 1920 Antwerp | Individual dressage |
| Silver medal – second place | 1924 Paris | Individual dressage |
| Silver medal – second place | 1932 Los Angeles | Team dressage |

Karl Bertil Sandström (25 November 1887 – 1 December 1964) was a Swedish military officer and horse rider. He competed at the 1920, 1924 and 1932 Summer Olympics in the individual dressage and won silver medals in 1920 and 1924. In 1932, he won another silver in the team dressage. In the individual event, he originally placed second, but was moved to the last place for using clicking sounds to control his horse, which was not allowed.
