= Hans von Rosen =

Swedish equestrian

Olympic medal record

Men's Equestrian
Gold medal – first place	1912 Stockholm	Team jumping
Gold medal – first place	1920 Antwerp	Team jumping
Bronze medal – third place	1920 Antwerp	Individual dressage

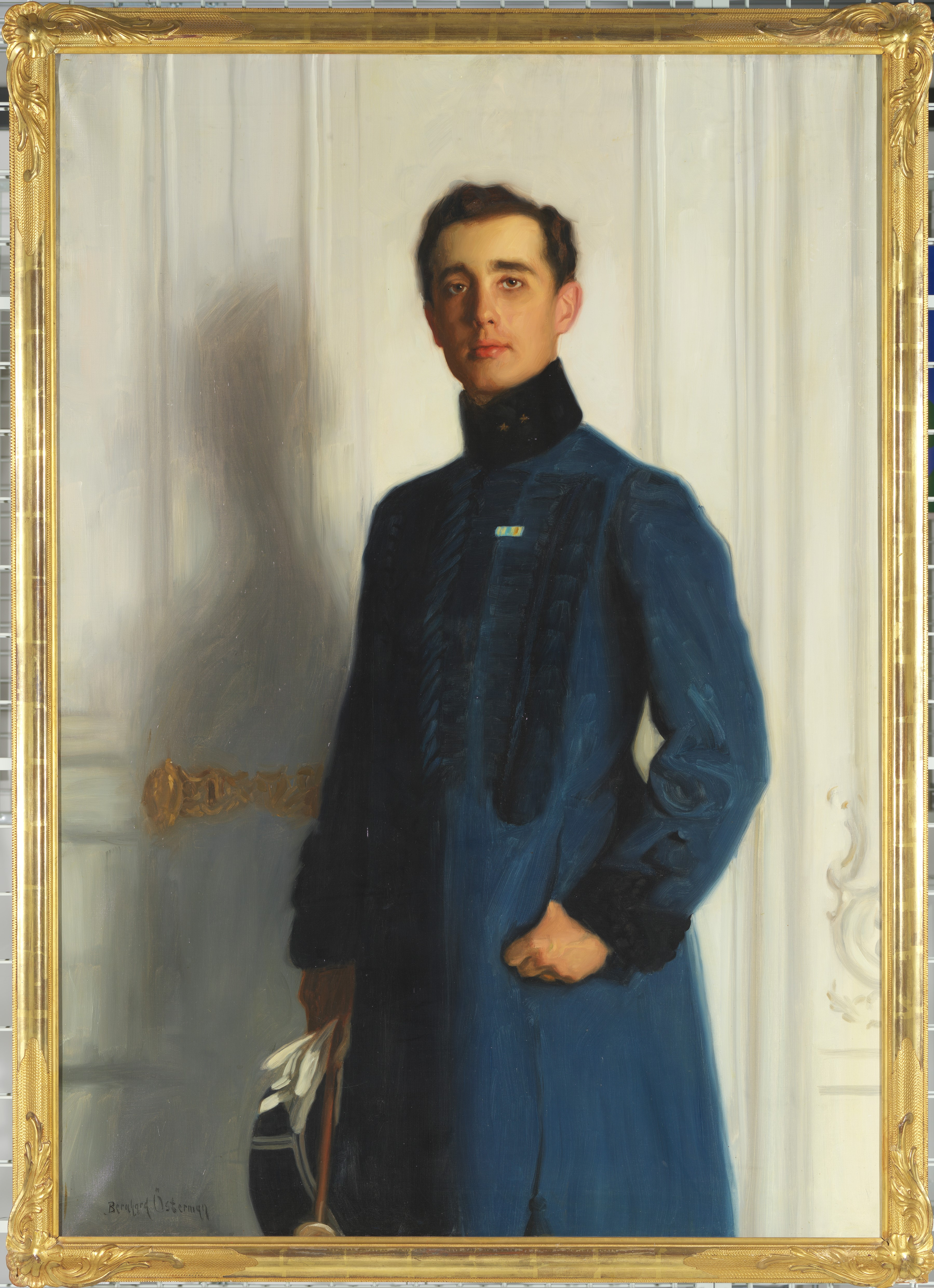
Portrait by Bernhard Österman, 1918

Count Hans Robert von Rosen (8 August 1888 – 2 September 1952) was a Swedish Army captain and horse rider who competed in the 1912 Summer Olympics and in the 1920 Summer Olympics.

== Career ==
In 1912, he and his horse Lord Iron were part of the Swedish equestrian team, which won the gold medal in the team jumping.

Eight years later, he won the gold medal with the Swedish jumping team again, this time with his horse Poor Boy. He also competed in the individual dressage event and won the bronze medal with his horse Running Sister.

von Rosen became ryttmästare in 1925 and equerry at the Royal Court of Sweden the same year.

== Awards and decorations ==
- King Gustaf V's Jubilee Commemorative Medal (1948)
- Knight of the Order of Vasa
- Second Class of the Military Cross
