= Georg von Braun =

Swedish equestrian

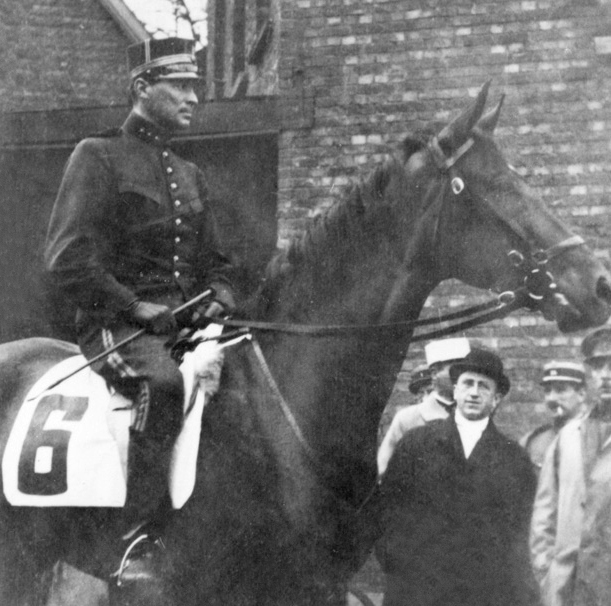

Personal information
- Born: 21 March 1886 Istrum, Sweden
- Died: 23 August 1972 (aged 86) Täby, Stockholm, Sweden

Sport
- Sport: Horse riding
- Club: A7 IF, Visby
Medal record
Representing Sweden
Olympic Games
Gold medal – first place	1920 Antwerp	Team eventing
Gold medal – first place	1924 Paris	Team jumping

Georg Gustaf Wilhelm von Braun (21 March 1886 – 23 August 1972) was a Swedish horse rider who competed in the 1920 and 1924 Summer Olympics. In 1920 he and his horse Diana finished eighth in the individual eventing competition and won a gold medal with the Swedish eventing team. Four years later he finished 19th in the individual jumping and was a member of the gold medal-winning Swedish team. He did not receive any medal for that at the time, but is listed as a gold medalist for that too on IOC's site.

Von Braun began his military training in 1904, and after 1906 served with the Gotland Artillery Corps. In 1920–21 he briefly worked as an Honorary Attaché at the Swedish Embassy in London. In 1930, being a captain, he was transferred to Karlsborg Artillery Regiment, and in 1933 to the Göta Artillery Regiment. He was a major then. In 1942 he joined Stockholm Anti-Aircraft Regiment and retired as a colonel in 1950. His son Detlow von Braun became an Olympic sailor.
