= Åge Lundström =

Swedish Air Force general and equestrian

- Johan August Lundström
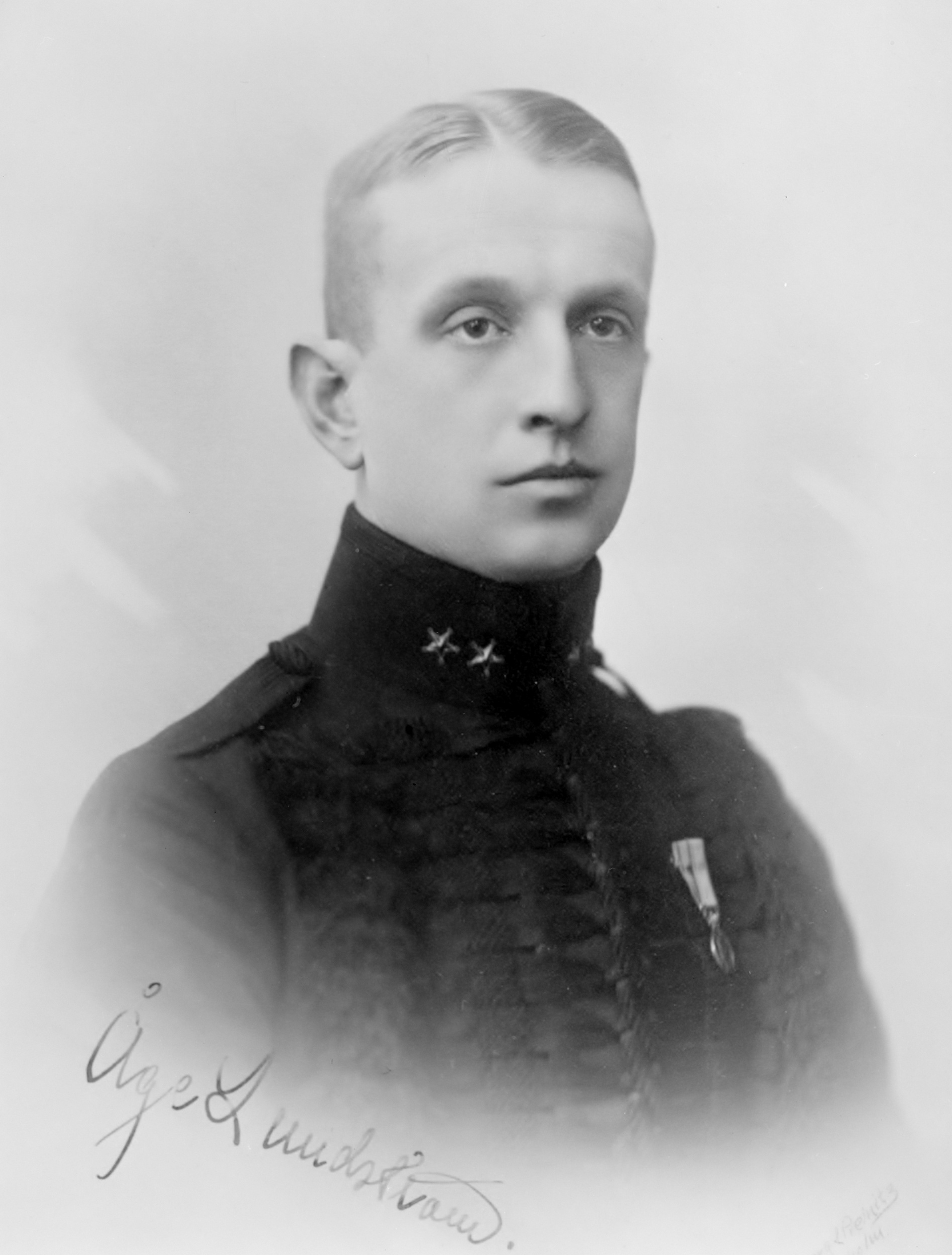
- Born: 8 June 1890; Stockholm, Sweden
- Died: 26 September 1975 (aged 85); Landskrona, Sweden
- Military career
- Allegiance: Sweden
- Branch: Army (1910–1926); Air Force (1926–1947)
- Service years: 1910–1947
- Rank: Major General
- Commands: 4th Air Corps; Swedish Air Force Flying School; 2nd Air Command
- Other work: Adjutant of the Prince Gustaf Adolf, Duke of Västerbotten; Chief of staff of Folke Bernadotte's delegation

Major General Johan August "Åge" Lundström (8 June 1890 – 26 September 1975) was a Swedish Air Force officer and horse rider who competed in the 1920 and 1924 Summer Olympics.

== Early life ==
Lundström was born on 8 June 1890 in Stockholm, Sweden, the son of Ernst Lundström, an artist, and his wife countess Mathilda (née Rudenschöld).

== Career ==
=== Military career ===
Lundström was commissioned as an officer in 1910 and was appointed lieutenant in the Life Regiment Dragoons in 1916. He became an air force pilot in 1925 and was appointed captain in the General Staff in 1924 and captain of the Swedish Air Force in 1926. Lundström was a teacher in air warfare at the Royal Swedish Army Staff College from 1926 to 1929 and at the Royal Military Academy from 1928 to 31. He was promoted to major in 1932, lieutenant colonel in 1936, colonel in 1937, and major general in 1945. Lundström left the military in 1947.

He was the adjutant of the Prince Gustaf Adolf, Duke of Västerbotten from 1929. Lundström was acting commanding officer of the 4th Air Corps from 1931 to 1932 and commanding officer of the Swedish Air Force Flying School from 1932 to 1943 and commanding officer of the 2nd Air Command from 1943 to 1946. Lundström was the chief of staff and assistant to Count Folke Bernadotte during his mediator works in Palestine in 1948, and was an eyewitness to Bernadotte's assassination.

=== Sports career ===
Åge Lundström
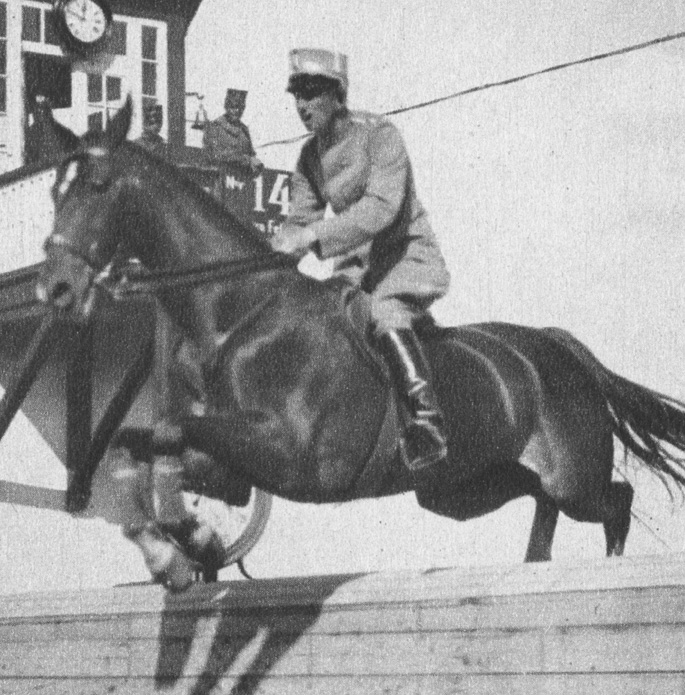

Medal record

Olympic Games

Equestrian
Gold medal – first place	1920 Antwerp	Team eventing
Gold medal – first place	1924 Paris	Team jumping
Silver medal – second place	1920 Antwerp	Individual eventing

Lundström was a Swedish champion in foil fencing in 1914, and a district champion in foil and épée fencing in 1933 and in foil fencing in 1938. He was adjutant and teacher at the riding school at Strömsholm Palace in 1919–1921.

At the 1920 Summer Olympics he and his horse Yrsa were part of the Swedish equestrian team, which won the gold medal in the team eventing competition. They also won the silver medal in the individual eventing. He competed in the individual jumping event with another horse, Eros I, and finished 14th.

At the 1924 Summer Olympics Lundström and his horse Anvers won the gold medal with the Swedish jumping team. In the individual jumping event they finished 10th.

== Personal life ==
Lundström was the owner of the estate Hildesborg outside Landskrona. In 1932 he married Margit von Geijer (born 1907), daughter of ryttmästare Wilhelm von Geijer and Countess Irma von Hallwyl. He was the father of Signe (born 1934), Irma (born 1936) and Åge (born 1943).

== Dates of rank ==
Dates of rank:

- 30 December 1910 – Underlöjtnant
- 11 February 1916 – Second lieutenant
- 27 June 1919 – First lieutenant
- 2 May 1924 – Captain
- 5 December 1924 – Ryttmästare
- 1 July 1926 – Captain (Swedish Air Force)
- 1 April 1932 – Major
- 1 July 1936 – Lieutenant colonel
- 23 December 1937 – Colonel
- 1 July 1945 – Major general

== Awards and decorations ==
=== Swedish ===
- (Sweden) King Gustaf V's Jubilee Commemorative Medal (1948)
- (Sweden) Commander 1st Class of the Order of the Sword (6 June 1945)
- (Sweden) Commander 2nd Class of the Order of the Sword (15 November 1941)
- (Sweden) Knight of the Order of the Polar Star (1938)
- (Sweden) Medal for Noble Deeds in gold
- (Sweden) Swedish Military Sports Association's gold medal with wreath (Sveriges militära idrottsförbunds guldmedalj med krans)
- (Sweden) Royal Swedish Aero Club Medal of Merit in gold (Kungliga Svenska Aeroklubbens förtjänstguldmedalj)

=== Foreign ===
- (Saxe-Coburg and Gotha) Commander of the Saxe-Ernestine House Order (before 1942)
- (Poland) Commander 2nd Class of the Order of Polonia Restituta (before 1942)
- (Nazi Germany) 1st Class of the Order of the German Eagle (before 1942)
- Officer of the Order of the Crown of Italy (before 1942)
- (Belgium) 2nd Class of the Military Cross (before 1942)
- Knight 1st Class Knight of the Order of the White Rose of Finland (before 1942)
- (France) Knight of the Legion of Honour (before 1942)

== Honours ==
- Member of the Royal Swedish Academy of War Sciences (1937)

Military offices
Preceded by Gösta von Porat	Acting commanding officer of the 4th Air Corps; 1931–1932	Succeeded by Georg Gärdin
Preceded by Arvid Flory	Head of the Swedish Air Force Flying School; 1932–1943	Succeeded by Ingemar Nygren
Preceded by None	Commanding General of the 2nd Air Command; 1943–1946	Succeeded by Folke Ramström
