= Knut Gysler =

Norwegian equestrian

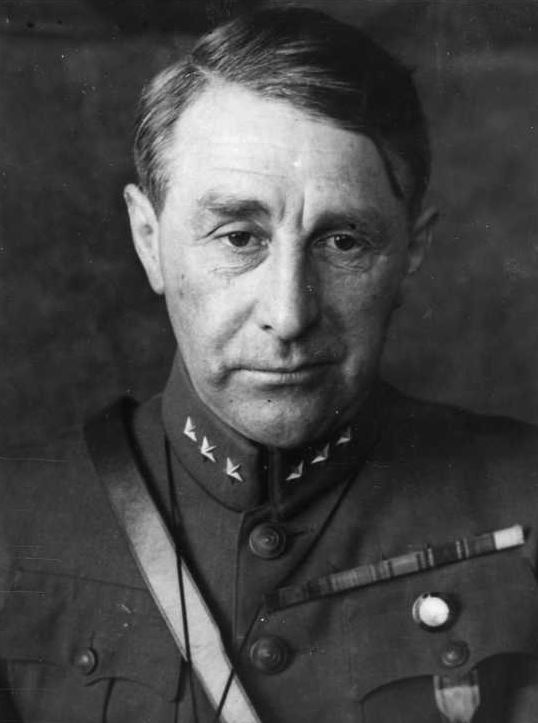
- Gysler pictured in 1935

Personal information
- Nationality: Norwegian
- Born: Knut Trygve Gysler; 21 February 1888 Christiania
- Died: 22 May 1967 (aged 79)

Sport
- Sport: Equestrian

Knut Trygve Gysler (21 February 1888 – 22 May 1967) was a Norwegian equestrian. He was born in Christiania. He competed at the 1920 Summer Olympics in Antwerp, where he placed 9th in individual eventing. He competed at the 1928 Summer Olympics in Amsterdam, where he tied 21st in individual jumping, and placed 11th in team jumping.

Gysler was an officer (rittmeister in the cavalry of the Norwegian Army, and fought in the Norwegian Campaign of World War II. Between 1930 and 1940 he also ran and owned the Hippodromen riding center in Oslo. One of his riding pupils was the Norwegian queen, Queen Maud (1869–1938).
