= Roger Moeremans d'Emaüs =

Belgian horse rider and rower

Olympic medal record

Men's equestrian
Bronze medal – third place	1920 Antwerp	Team eventing

Roger Édouard Louis Marie Joseph Ghislain Moeremans d'Emaüs (12 June 1890 – 19 March 1975) was a Belgian horse rider and rowing coxswain who competed in the 1920 Summer Olympics.

In 1920, he and his horse Sweet Girl won the bronze medal in the team eventing, after finishing fourth in the individual eventing competition. They also participated in the individual jumping event and finished seventh.
