= Gustaf Dyrsch =

Swedish equestrian

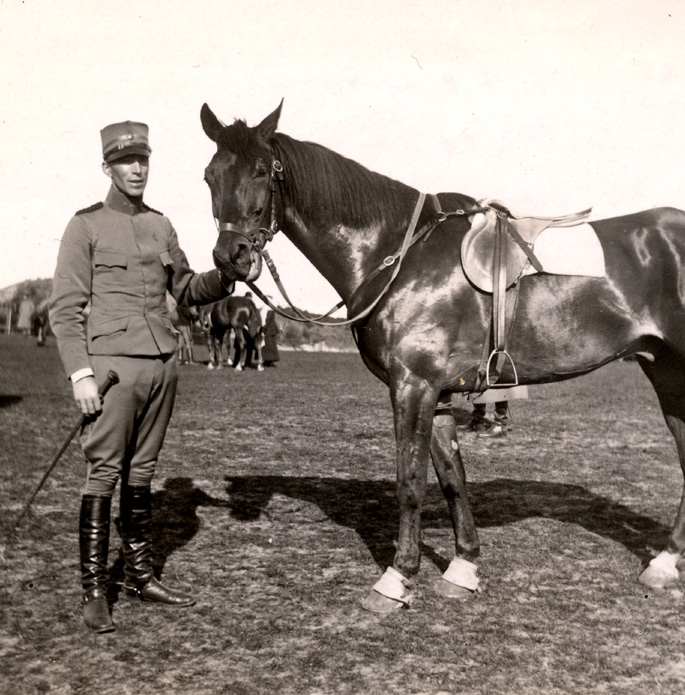

Personal information
- Born: 28 August 1890 Stockholm, Sweden
- Died: 7 May 1974 (aged 83) Sollentuna, Stockholm, Sweden

Sport
- Sport: Horse riding
- Club: Ing1 IF, Stockholm

Karl Gustaf Wilhelm Dyrsch (28 August 1890 – 7 May 1974) was a Swedish Army officer and horse rider who competed in the 1920 Summer Olympics. He and his horse Salamis were part of the Swedish team that won the gold medal in eventing. However, Dyrsch did not receive a medal as he failed to complete his individual routine.

Dyrsch was a career military officer holding the rank of lieutenant colonel in 1947.
