= Carlo Asinari =

Italian equestrian

Personal information
- Full name: Carlo Di San Marzano Asinari
- Nationality: Italian
- Born: 3 November 1884 Pisa, Italy
- Died: 2 February 1953 (aged 68) Turin, Italy

Sport
- Country: Italy
- Sport: Equestrianism
- Event: Show jumping
Medal record
Olympic Games
Bronze medal – third place	1920 Antwerp	Team jumping

Carlo Asinari (3 November 1884 – 2 February 1953) was an Italian show jumping rider, that won a bronze medal at the Olympic Games. He was born in Pisa and died in Turin.

== Biography ==
Asinari participated in the 1920 Summer Olympics.

== Achievements ==
Year	Competition	Venue	Position	Event	Notes
1920	Olympic Games	(Belgium) Antwerp	3rd	Team jumping	
