= Jules Bonvalet =

Belgian equestrian

Olympic medal record

Representing Belgium

Men's Equestrian
Bronze medal – third place	1920 Antwerp	Team eventing

Jules Bonvalet (born 18 June 1888, date of death unknown) was a Belgian horse rider who competed in the 1920 Summer Olympics and in the 1924 Summer Olympics. In 1920 he and his horse Weppelghem won the bronze medal in the team eventing, after finishing twelfth in the individual eventing competition. They also participated in the individual jumping event and finished fifteenth. Four years later he and his horse Weppelghem finished fifth as member of the Belgian equipé in the team eventing, after finishing 16th in the individual eventing competition.
