= Jacques Misonne =

Belgian equestrian (1892–1968)

Jacques Pierre Joseph Marie Misonne (11 December 1892 in Leuven, Flemish Brabant, Belgium – 25 September 1968 in Haut-Ittre, Walloon Brabant, Belgium) was a Belgian horse rider who competed in the 1920 Summer Olympics, in the 1924 Summer Olympics, and in the 1928 Summer Olympics.

In 1920, he and his horse Gaucho finished 17th in the individual eventing competition. They also participated in the individual jumping event, finishing 25th.

Four years later, riding Torino, he finished fourth with the Belgian team in the team jumping competition after finishing 13th in the individual jumping event.

In 1928, on Keepsake, he was a member of the Belgian team which finished 14th in the team jumping competition after finishing 38th in the individual jumping event.
