= Equestrian at the 1924 Summer Olympics – Individual eventing =

Equestrian at the Olympics

Individual eventing at the Games of the VIII Olympiad
- Venue: Stade Olympique Yves-du-Manoir
- Dates: 21–26 July
- Competitors: 44 from 13 nations

Medalists
1st place, gold medalist(s)		Adolph van der Voort van Zijp; Netherlands
2nd place, silver medalist(s)		Frode Kirkebjerg; Denmark
3rd place, bronze medalist(s)		Sloan Doak; United States

One of the competitions in equestrian at the 1924 Summer Olympics was the individual eventing. The rules only allowed military officers to join the competition. From the results of the individual eventing, a team event was compiled.

== Individual event ==
The individual eventing was divided into three parts: dressage (10% of the total score), field (70%) and jumping (20%). The field was again divided into public road, steeple chase (4 km) and cross country (8 km).

In the first event, dressage, the Dutch riders were the best, and they took the top four spots. Colenbrander ranked first, followed by Adolph van der Voort van Zijp.

The field competition was chaotic. After the race, the Dutch team saw that Van der Voort van Zijp was ranked 27th, and they complained. The organisation then discovered that they had mixed up the scores, and that Van der Voort van Zijp had actually finished second in the field competition. In the overall competition, he was now leading.

In the jumping competition, Van der Voort van Zijp made no mistakes, so he kept the first position and won the event.

== Results ==
Place	Rider	Score
1st place, gold medalist(s)	Adolf van der Voort van Zijp (NED)	1976.0
2nd place, silver medalist(s)	Frode Kirkebjerg (DEN)	1853.5
3rd place, bronze medalist(s)	Sloan Doak (USA)	1845.5
4	Charles Pahud de Mortanges (NED)	1828.0
5	Claës König (SWE)	1730.0
6	Edward de Fonblanque (GBR)	1728.5
6	Baudouin de Brabandère (BEL)	1728.5
8	Frank Carr (USA)	1727.0
9	Torsten Sylvan (SWE)	1678.0
10	Karol Rómmel (POL)	1648.5
11	Alberto Lombardi (ITA)	1572.0
12	Alessandro Alvisi (ITA)	1536.0
13	Gerard de Kruijff (NED)	1493.5
14	Hans Bühler (SUI)	1477.5
15	Charles Stoffel (SUI)	1466.0
16	Jules Bonvalet (BEL)	1428.0
17	Emanuele Beraudo Di Pralormo (ITA)	1404.5
18	Werner Fehr (SUI)	1395.0
19	Keith Hervey (GBR)	1354.0
20	Gustaf Hagelin (SWE)	1335.5
21	Joseph Fallon (BEL)	1077.0
22	Alec Tod (GBR)	982.0
23	Kazimierz Szosland (POL)	964.5
24	Kazimierz de Rostwo-Suski (POL)	958.5
25	Antonius Colenbrander (NED)	952.5
26	Tadeusz Komorowski (POL)	929.0
27	Léon Nossent (BEL)	924.0
28	René de Ribeaupierre (SUI)	904.5
29	Philip Bowden-Smith (GBR)	878.0
30	Michel Artola (FRA)	737.0
31	Vladimir Stoychev (BUL)	533.5
32	Josef Charous (TCH)	359.5
–	John Barry (USA)	Did not finish
–	Camille de Sartiges (FRA)	Did not finish
–	Lars Ehrnrooth (FIN)	Did not finish
–	Bedřich John (TCH)	Did not finish
–	Charles Jacques Le Vavasseur (FRA)	Did not finish
–	Krum Lekarski (BUL)	Did not finish
–	Tommaso Lequio di Assaba (ITA)	Did not finish
–	Carl Gustaf Lewenhaupt (SWE)	Did not finish
–	Vernon Padgett (USA)	Did not finish
–	Matěj Pechman (TCH)	Did not finish
–	Léon Rigon (FRA)	Did not finish
–	František Statečný (TCH)	Did not finish

== Sources ==
- Wudarski, Pawel (1999). "Wyniki Igrzysk Olimpijskich" (in Polish). Archived from the original on 16 February 2009.
