= Equestrian at the 1928 Summer Olympics – Individual eventing =

Equestrian at the Olympics

Individual eventing at the Games of the IX Olympiad
- Venue: Hilversum
- Competitors: 46 from 17 nations

Medalists
1st place, gold medalist(s)		Charles Pahud de Mortanges and Marcroix	Netherlands
2nd place, silver medalist(s)		Gerard de Kruijff and Va-T'en	Netherlands
3rd place, bronze medalist(s)		Bruno Neumann and Ilja	Germany

The individual eventing at the 1928 Summer Olympics (referred to at the time as the "competition for the equestrian championship") took place at Hilversum. The event consisted of a dressage competition, a jumping competition, and an endurance test. Scores in each component were added to give a total. Scores from the individual competition were summed to give results in the team competition.

== Results ==
Source: Official results; De Wael

Rank	Rider	Nation	Horse	Total Score
1st place, gold medalist(s)	Charles Pahud de Mortanges	Netherlands	Marcroix	1969.82
2nd place, silver medalist(s)	Gerard de Kruijff	Netherlands	Va-t-en	1967.26
3rd place, bronze medalist(s)	Bruno Neumann	Germany	Ilja	1944.42
4	Adolf van der Voort van Zijp	Netherlands	Silver Piece	1928.60
5	Hans Olof von Essen	Finland	El Kaid	1924.64
6	Bjart Ording	Norway	And Over	1912.98
7	Nils Kettner	Sweden	Caesar	1901.66
8	Arthur Qvist	Norway	Hidalgo	1895.14
9	Peder Jensen	Denmark	Pearl	1885.24
10	Rudolf Lippert	Germany	Flucht	1872.62
11	Louis Rousseaux	Belgium	Swang	1872.02
12	Willy Gerber	Switzerland	Chesnut Lily	1870.40
13	Sven Colliander	Sweden	King	1868.92
14	Giuseppe Valenzano	Italy	Jaddo	1861.52
15	Alfréd von Adda	Hungary	vAlvezér	1845.18
16	Josef Charous	Czechoslovakia	Engadin	1844.44
17	Sloan Doak	United States	Misty Morn	1841.08
18	François Denis de Rivoyre	France	Nistos	1831.32
19	Michał Antoniewicz	Poland	Moja Mila	1822.50
20	Charles Stoffel	Switzerland	Attila	1818.46
21	Shunzo Kido	Japan	Kyngun	1812.66
22	Frank Carr	United States	Verdun Belle	1773.52
23	Eugenio Cerboneschi	Italy	Derna	1733.04
24	José María Cabanillas	Spain	Barrabás	1708.56
25	Józef Trenkwald	Poland	Lwi Pazur	1645.20
26	Karol von Rómmel	Poland	Donese	1600.22
27	Eugen Johansen	Norway	Baby	1587.56
28	Henri Pernot du Breuil	France	Titania	1511.70
–	Walter Feyerabend	Germany	Alpenrose	DNF
–	Todor Semov	Bulgaria	Arsenal	DNF
–	Cai Gundelach	Denmark	Beauty	DNF
–	Cseh von Szent-Katolna Kálmán	Hungary	Bene	DNF
–	Vladimir Stoychev	Bulgaria	Darda	DNF
–	Josef Seyfried	Czechoslovakia	Ekul	DNF
–	František Statečný	Czechoslovakia	Fesák	DNF
–	Krum Lekarski	Bulgaria	Gigant	DNF
–	Louis-Marie de Jonghe d'Ardoye	Belgium	Gigolo	DNF
–	Ottó Binder	Hungary	Jukker	DNF
–	Victor Ankarcrona	Sweden	Mascha	DNF
–	Charles George	United States	Ozella	DNF
–	Emmanuel-Marie Longin Spindler	France	Poupée	DNF
–	Francisco Jiménez	Spain	Quart d'heure	DNF
–	Georges Van der Ton	Belgium	Remember Erin	DNF
–	Angelio Somalo	Spain	Royal	DNF
–	René de Ribeaupierre	Switzerland	Sergent	DNF
–	Tommaso Lequio di Assaba	Italy	Uroski	DNF
