= Equestrian at the 1924 Summer Olympics – Team eventing =

Equestrian at the Olympics

Team eventing at the Games of the VIII Olympiad
- Venue: Stade Olympique Yves-du-Manoir
- Dates: 21–26 July
- Competitors: 40 from 10 nations

Medalists
1st place, gold medalist(s)		Antonius Colenbrander, Gerard de Kruijff, Charles Pahud de Mortanges, Adolph van der Voort van Zijp; Netherlands
2nd place, silver medalist(s)		Gustaf Hagelin, Claës König, Carl Gustaf Lewenhaupt, Torsten Sylvan; Sweden
3rd place, bronze medalist(s)		Alessandro Alvisi, Emanuele Beraudo di Pralormo, Tommaso Lequio di Assaba, Alberto Lombardi; Italy

One of the competitions in equestrian at the 1924 Summer Olympics was the team eventing. The rules only allowed military officers to join the competition. From the results of the individual eventing, a team event was compiled.

== Team event ==
The results of the first three officers were combined. The Dutch team, consisting of Adolph van der Voort van Zijp, Charles Pahud de Mortanges, Gerard de Kruijff and Antonius Colenbrander (whose results did not count) won that competition.

== Results ==
The scores of riders in italics (the fourth-best rider on each team as well as non-finishers) were not counted.

Place	Team	Riders	Score
1st place, gold medalist(s)	Netherlands	Adolf van der Voort van Zijp; Charles Pahud de Mortanges; Gerard de Kruijff; Antonius Colenbrander	5297.5
2nd place, silver medalist(s)	Sweden	Claës König; Torsten Sylvan; Gustaf Hagelin; Carl Gustaf Lewenhaupt	4743.5
3rd place, bronze medalist(s)	Italy	Alberto Lombardi; Alessandro Alvisi; Emanuele Beraudo Di Pralormo; Tommaso Lequio di Assaba	4512.5
4	Switzerland	Hans Bühler; Charles Stoffel; Werner Fehr; René de Ribeaupierre	4338.5
5	Belgium	Baudouin de Brabandère; Jules Bonvalet; Joseph Fallon; Léon Nossent	4233.5
6	Great Britain	Edward de Fonblanque; Keith Hervey; Alec Tod; Philip Bowden-Smith	4064.5
7	Poland	Karol von Rómmel; Kazimierz Szosland; Kazimierz de Rostwo-Suski; Tadeusz Komorowski	3751.5
–	Czechoslovakia	Josef Charous; Bedřich John; Matěj Pechman; František Statečný	Did not finish
–	France	Michel Artola; Camille de Sartiges; Jean le Vavasseur; Louis Rigon	Did not finish
–	United States	Sloan Doak; Frank Carr; John Barry; Vernon Padgett	Did not finish

== Sources ==
- Wudarski, Pawel (1999). "Wyniki Igrzysk Olimpijskich" (in Polish). Archived from the original on 16 February 2009.
