= Equestrian at the 1928 Summer Olympics – Team eventing =

Team eventing at the Games of the IX Olympiad
- Venue: Hilversum
- Competitors: 46 from 17 nations

Medalists
1st place, gold medalist(s)		Netherlands; Charles Pahud de Mortanges and Marcroix, Gerard de Kruijff and Va-T'en, Adolph van der Voort van Zijp and Silver Piece
2nd place, silver medalist(s)		Norway; Bjart Ording and And Over, Arthur Qvist and Hidalgo, Eugen Johansen and Baby
3rd place, bronze medalist(s)		Poland; Michał Antoniewicz and Moja Miła, Józef Trenkwald and Lwi Pazur, Karol Rómmel and Doneuse

The team eventing at the 1928 Summer Olympics (referred to at the time as the "competition for the equestrian championship") took place at Hilversum. The event consisted of a dressage competition, a jumping competition, and an endurance test. Scores in each component were added to give a total. Scores from the individual competition were summed to give results in the team competition.

Pairs that did not finish scored zero for their teams. Only three teams had all three of their pairs finish, with each of those teams winning medals. The fourth to ninth places went to teams that had two finishers, and tenth to thirteenth places went to teams with just one finisher. Bulgaria was credited with fourteenth place, though none of its pairs finished.

== Results ==
Source: Official results; De Wael

Rank	Nation	Rider	Horse	Score	Total Score
1st place, gold medalist(s)	Netherlands	Charles Pahud de Mortanges	Marcroix	1969.82	5865.68
1st place, gold medalist(s)	Netherlands	Gerard de Kruijff	Va-t-en	1967.26	5865.68
1st place, gold medalist(s)	Netherlands	Adolf van der Voort van Zijp	Silver Piece	1928.60	5865.68
2nd place, silver medalist(s)	Norway	Bjart Ording	And Over	1912.98	5395.68
2nd place, silver medalist(s)	Norway	Arthur Qvist	Hidalgo	1895.14	5395.68
2nd place, silver medalist(s)	Norway	Eugen Johansen	Baby	1587.56	5395.68
3rd place, bronze medalist(s)	Poland	Michał Antoniewicz	Moja Mila	1822.50	5067.92
3rd place, bronze medalist(s)	Poland	Józef Trenkwald	Lwi Pazur	1645.20	5067.92
3rd place, bronze medalist(s)	Poland	Karol von Rómmel	Donese	1600.22	5067.92
4	Germany	Bruno Neumann	Ilja	1944.42	3817.04
4	Germany	Rudolf Lippert	Flucht	1872.62	3817.04
4	Germany	Walter Feyerabend	Alpenrose	0	3817.04
5	Sweden	Nils Kettner	Caesar	1901.66	3770.58
5	Sweden	Sven Colliander	King	1868.92	3770.58
5	Sweden	Victor Ankarcrona	Mascha	0	3770.58
6	Switzerland	Willy Gerber	Chesnut Lily	1870.40	3688.86
6	Switzerland	Charles Stoffel	Attila	1818.46	3688.86
6	Switzerland	René de Ribeaupierre	Sergent	0	3688.86
7	United States	Sloan Doak	Misty Morn	1841.08	3614.60
7	United States	Frank Carr	Verdun Belle	1773.52	3614.60
7	United States	Charles George	Ozella	0	3614.60
8	Italy	Giuseppe Valenzano	Jaddo	1861.52	3594.56
8	Italy	Eugenio Cerboneschi	Derna	1733.04	3594.56
8	Italy	Tommaso Lequio di Assaba	Uroski	0	3594.56
9	France	François Denis de Rivoyre	Nistos	1831.32	3343.02
9	France	Henri Pernot du Breuil	Titania	1511.70	3343.02
9	France	E. M. Longin Spindler	Poupée	0	3343.02
10	Belgium	Louis Rousseaux	Swang	1872.02	1872.02
10	Belgium	Louis-Marie de Jonghe d'Ardoye	Gigolo	0	1872.02
10	Belgium	Georges Van der Ton	Remember Erin	0	1872.02
11	Hungary	Alfréd von Adda	vAlvezér	1845.18	1845.18
11	Hungary	Binder Ottó	Jukker	0	1845.18
11	Hungary	Cseh von Szent-Katolna Kálmán	Bene	0	1845.18
12	Czechoslovakia	Josef Charous	Engadin	1844.44	1844.44
12	Czechoslovakia	Josef Seyfried	Ekul	0	1844.44
12	Czechoslovakia	František Statečný	Fesák	0	1844.44
13	Spain	José María Cabanillas	Barrabás	1708.56	1708.56
13	Spain	Francisco Giménez	Quart d'heure	0	1708.56
13	Spain	Angelio Somalo	Royal	0	1708.56
14	Bulgaria	Krum Lekarski	Gigant	0	0
14	Bulgaria	Todor Semov	Arsenal	0	0
14	Bulgaria	Vladimir Stoychev	Darda	0	0
