= Bulgaria at the 1896 Summer Olympics =

- IOC code: BUL
- NOC: Bulgarian Olympic Committee

in Athens, Greece April 6, 1896 – April 15, 1896
- Competitors: 1 in 2 sports and 4 events
- Medals: Gold 0 Silver 0 Bronze 0 Total 0

Summer Olympics appearances (overview)
- 1896; 1900–1920; 1924; 1928; 1932; 1936; 1948; 1952; 1956; 1960; 1964; 1968; 1972; 1976; 1980; 1984; 1988; 1992; 1996; 2000; 2004; 2008; 2012; 2016; 2020; 2024; 2028

Bulgaria competed at the 1896 Summer Olympics, the first Olympics, in Athens, Greece, from 6 to 15 April 1896. The delegation consisted of one athlete competing in two sports and four events – athlete Charles Champaud, a Swiss high school gymnastics teacher living in Sofia. He is sometimes counted as a competitor for Switzerland. There were meant to be five competitors competing for the nation, but Champaud was the only one to arrive on time and the only one to compete. Bulgaria did not win any medals during the Athens Olympics.

== Background ==
=== Delegation ===
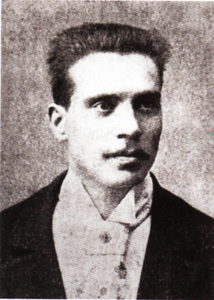
Champaud around the time of the Games

Charles Champaud was the only competitor for Bulgaria in the Games. He is also known for being one of two people to be credited with introducing association football to Sofia in 1895, along with Georges de Regibus. In 1897, Champaud seriously injured his leg and was sent back to Switzerland for treatment. Nothing is known about his life after that. The delegation consisted of five members, the head of the delegation, Todor Yonchev, who was also chairman of the gymnastics club, Yunak, Dimitar Iliev, Panayot Belev, Ivan Panchov, and Champaud. However, Champaud was the only one to participate as the other four arrived three days late due to a misunderstanding about the Julian and Gregorian calendar systems. The competitors were each paid 20 gold lev per day, and their second class travel expenses were reimbursed. Champaud has been listed both as a Swiss and a Bulgarian competitors in different sources. His name has also been spelled Champoff. Cyril Verbus, a competitor for Belgium, was incorrectly reported as a Bulgarian athlete by French newspaper, Le Fiagro.

Sport	Men	Women	Total
Athletics	1	0	1
Gymnastics	1	0	1
Total	1	0	1

1896 was the first year that the modern Olympic Games were held in and hence the appearance of Bulgaria at the Athens Summer Olympics marked their first Olympic appearance. It took place from 6 to 15 April 1896. The nation's delegation consisted of one athlete competing in two sports and four events.

== Athletics ==
Champaud was to compete in men's pole vault, however he did not start. In the event, which took place on 10 April in the Panathenaic Stadium, there were 16 entries, but only 5 competed. The event was eventually won by Bill Hoyt, an American.

Athlete	Event	Height	Rank
Charles Champaud	Men's pole vault	DNS	

== Gymnastics ==
Champaud competed in three of the gymnastics events, winning no medals. He competed in the men's vault event on 9 April at the Panathenaic Stadium; he placed fifth. The event was eventually won by the German Carl Schuhmann. He then competed at the men's pommel horse event on the same day in the same place and came somewhere between 3rd and 15th place. That event was eventually won by the Swiss Louis Zutter. He also participated in the men's parallel bars event on 10 April in the same stadium and placed somewhere between 3rd and 18th. The event was eventually won by Alfred Flatow, a German competitor.

Athlete	Event	Score	Rank
Charles Champaud	Men's vault	Unknown	5
Charles Champaud	Men's pommel horse	Unknown	3–15
Charles Champaud	Men's parallel bars	Unknown	3–18
