= Louis-Emil Eyer =

Swiss-Bulgarian sports pedagogue and public figure

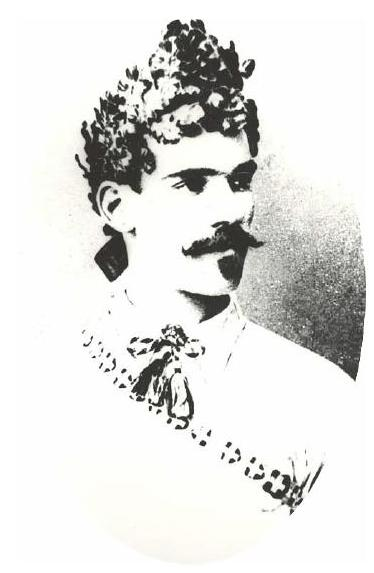
Louis-Emil Eyer (1865–1916)

Louis-Emil Eyer (Bulgarian: Луи-Емил Айер) (28 October 1865–2 September 1916) was a Swiss-Bulgarian sports pedagogue and public figure regarded as the founder of the sports movement in Bulgaria.

Born in Bex in the Canton of Vaud, Eyer studied in Lausanne, Geneva and Neuchâtel and taught sport disciplines in Vevey. In 1894, Eyer and nine other Swiss pedagogues, including Georges de Regibus and Charles Champaud, were invited to Bulgaria by the Minister of Education Georgi Zhivkov to lay the foundations of sports education in the country. Eyer taught physical education in Lom (1894), Silistra (1903) and Rousse (1909) and was the main coach of the Yunak sports associationsaround the country. He introduced the sports of track-and-field, boxing, weightlifting, wrestling to Bulgarian physical education.

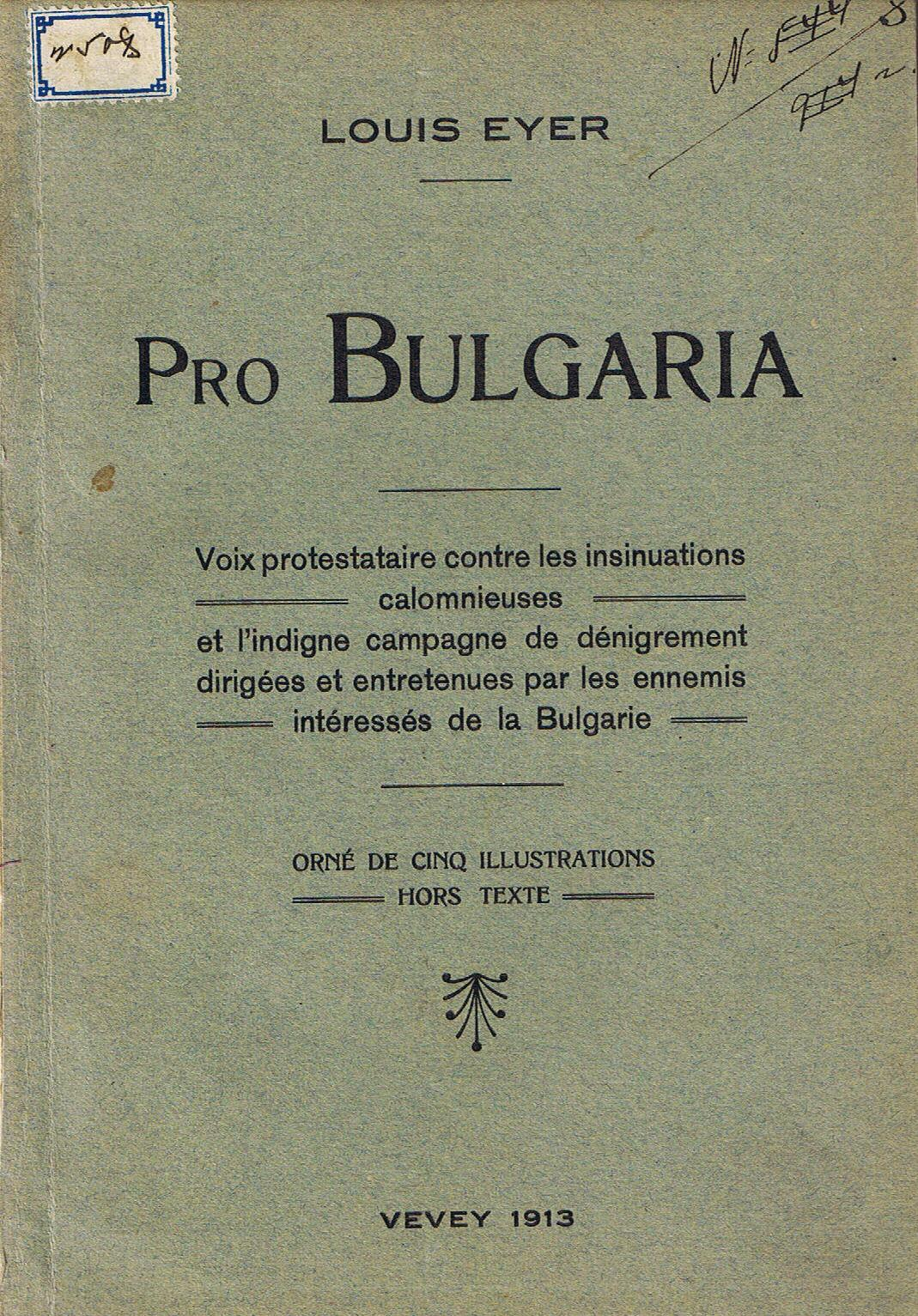
"Pro Bulgaria"

When the Balkan Wars broke out, Eyer, despite being a foreign citizen, regarded the protection of his second homeland as his duty and enlisted in the Bulgarian Army as a volunteer. He was a commander of a company of the Macedonian-Adrianopolitan Volunteer Corps' 12th Lozengrad Battalion. For his valour, he was twice awarded a Cross for Honour and was promoted to the rank of Second Lieutenant. Following Bulgaria's defeat in the Second Balkan War, he published the French-language book Pro Bulgaria ("For Bulgaria") in 1913, defending the Bulgarian position.

After Bulgaria joined World War I, Eyer again enlisted as a volunteer as an officer in the 38th Infantry Regiment. He died on 2 September 1916 during the Battle of Doiran, and was buried in the village of Čaušli, today in North Macedonia.

== Honours ==
In 1991, the Louis Eyer Bulgarian-Swiss Association was founded in Rousse. The stadium in Silistra is named after him, as are streets around the country.

Eyer Peak in Sentinel Range, Antarctica is named after Louis-Emil Eyer.
