= Valenzano =

Valenzano may refer to:

== Places ==
- Valenzano, Apulia, a town in Italy
  - Valenzano railway station
- Valenzano Winery, Shamong, New Jersey

== People ==
- Gino Valenzano (1920–2011), Italian racing driver
- Giuseppe Valenzano (1904–?), Italian equestrian
- Marcello Valenzano, "Cool" of Cool & Dre, an American producing and songwriting duo
