= Bulgaria at the 1928 Summer Olympics =

- IOC code: BUL
- NOC: Bulgarian Olympic Committee

in Amsterdam
- Competitors: 5 in 2 sports
- Flag bearer: Todor Semov
- Medals: Gold 0 Silver 0 Bronze 0 Total 0

Summer Olympics appearances (overview)
- 1896; 1900–1920; 1924; 1928; 1932; 1936; 1948; 1952; 1956; 1960; 1964; 1968; 1972; 1976; 1980; 1984; 1988; 1992; 1996; 2000; 2004; 2008; 2012; 2016; 2020; 2024; 2028

Bulgaria competed at the 1928 Summer Olympics in Amsterdam, Netherlands. Five competitors took part in five events in two sports.

== Equestrian ==
Three equestrians, all men, and four horses represented Bulgaria in 1928 in both individual and team format.

| Equestrian | Horse | Event | Final | | |
| Equestrian | Horse | Event | Score | Time | Rank |
|---|---|---|---|---|---|
| Vladimir Stoychev | Pan | Dressage | 200.76 | N/A | 18 |
| Vladimir Stoychev | Darda | Eventing | did not finish | | |
| Todor Semov | Arsenal | Eventing | did not finish | | |
| Krum Lekarski | Gigant | Eventing | did not finish | | |
| Vladimir Stoychev; Todor Semov; Krum Lekarski | Darda; Arsenal; Gigant | Team eventing | did not finish | | |

== Fencing ==
Two fencers, both men, represented Bulgaria in 1928.

Men

Ranks given are within the pool.

| Fencer | Event | Round 1 | | Round 2 | | Semifinals | | Final | |
| Fencer | Event | Result | Rank | Result | Rank | Result | Rank | Result | Rank |
|---|---|---|---|---|---|---|---|---|---|
| Dimitar Vasilev | Épée | 2–6 | 8 | did not advance | | | | | |
| Dimitar Vasilev | Sabre | 2–3 | 3 | n/a | | did not advance | | | |
| Asen Lekarski | Sabre | 0–5 | 6 | n/a | | did not advance | | | |
