= Polepy =

Polepy may refer to places in the Czech Republic:

- Polepy (Kolín District), a municipality and village in the Central Bohemian Region
- Polepy (Litoměřice District), a municipality and village in the Ústí nad Labem Region
