= Hans von Essen =

Hans von Essen may refer to:

- Hans Henric von Essen (1755–1824), Swedish officer, courtier and statesman
- Hans Olof von Essen (1900–1973), Finnish officer and equestrian
