= Werner Fehr =

Werner Fehr may refer to:

- Werner Fehr (equestrian) (1885–1963), Swiss Olympic equestrian
- Werner Fehr (field hockey) (fl. 1928), Swiss Olympic field hockey player
