= Charles George (disambiguation) =

Charles George (1932–1952) was a U.S. Army soldier and Medal of Honor recipient.

Charles George may also refer to:

- Greek George (Charles Peter George, 1912–1999), catcher in Major League Baseball
- Charles George (equestrian) (1886–1946), American equestrian
- Charles Joseph George (died 1906), Saro trader
- Charles Frederick George (born 1941), English physician
- Charlie George (born 1950), English footballer

== See also ==
- George Charles (disambiguation)
