= Bulgaria at the 2028 Summer Olympics =

- IOC code: BUL
- NOC: Bulgarian Olympic Committee
- Website: www.bgolympic.org (in Bulgarian and English)

in Los Angeles, United States 14 July 2028 – 30 July 2028
- Competitors: 1 in 1 sport
- Medals: Gold 0 Silver 0 Bronze 0 Total 0

Summer Olympics appearances (overview)
- 1896; 1900–1920; 1924; 1928; 1932; 1936; 1948; 1952; 1956; 1960; 1964; 1968; 1972; 1976; 1980; 1984; 1988; 1992; 1996; 2000; 2004; 2008; 2012; 2016; 2020; 2024; 2028

Bulgaria is set to compete at the 2028 Summer Olympics in Los Angeles, scheduled to take place from 14 to 30 July 2028, continuing its Olympic presence since its inaugural participation in 1896. The country's participation in the Summer Games has been interrupted on several occasions, including its absence from the 1900–1920 editions, the 1932 Los Angeles Games, the 1948 London Games, and the 1984 Los Angeles Games. Bulgaria's non-participation in 1932 occurred amid the economic constraints imposed by the Great Depression, while its absence in 1948 followed the country's involvement in the Second World War; in 1984, Bulgarian athletes did not compete as part of the Soviet-led boycott of the Los Angeles Games.

== Competitors ==
The following is the list of number of competitors in the Games.

Sport	Men	Women	Total
Gymnastics	0	1	1
Total	0	1	1

== Gymnastics ==
=== Rhythmic ===
Bulgaria earned an individual qualification spot by securing the individual all-around silver medal at the 2026 Rhythmic Gymnastics World Championships in Frankfurt, Germany, thereby obtaining one of the three qualification quotas awarded at the event.

Athlete	Event	Qualification						Final					
Athlete	Event	Hoop	Ball	Clubs	Ribbon	Total	Rank	Hoop	Ball	Clubs	Ribbon	Total	Rank
	Individual												
