= Charles Champaud =

Swiss gymnast who represented Bulgaria (born 1865)

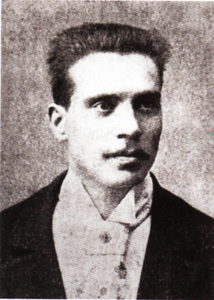
- Champaud in the c. 1890s

Personal information
- Full name: Charles Champaud
- Alternative names: Charles Champoff, Шарл Шампов, Charles Champov
- Born: 1865 Switzerland
- Died: Unknown

Gymnastics career
- Discipline: Men's artistic gymnastics
- Country represented: Bulgaria

Charles Champaud (Bulgarian: Шарл Шампо; born 1865 – date of death unknown), also known as Charles Champoff and Charles Champov, was a Swiss artistic gymnast and pole vaulter. Born in Switzerland, he moved to Bulgaria in May 1894 to teach gymnastics. He was one of two people to be credited with introducing association football to Sofia a year later. As part of the Yunak Gymnastic Society, he participated at the 1896 Summer Olympics.

He participated in the men's vault, men's pommel horse, and men's parallel bars, though did not medal. He was also entered to compete in the men's pole vault though did not start in his event. Various sources have listed Champaud as competing for either Bulgaria and Switzerland, though was considered as part of the Bulgarian delegation as he represented his gymnastics club in the country. He was the first Bulgarian Olympian.

== Biography ==
Champaud was born in 1865 in Switzerland. He was one of twelve Swiss gymnastics coaches that were sent to Bulgaria in May 1894 to coach gymnastics in local schools. The following year, he was one of two people to be credited with introducing association football to Sofia in 1895, along with fellow Swiss athlete Georges de Regibus. He taught at First Boys' High School until 1897. Domestically, he had represented the Yunak Gymnastic Society.

He was invited to represent the Yunak Gymnastic Society at the 1896 Summer Olympics. As part of the Bulgarian delegation, the full delegation consisted of five members; the head of the delegation, Todor Yonchev, who was also chairman of the gymnastics club, Junak, Dimitar Iliev, Panayot Belev, Ivan Panchov, and Champaud himself. Due to a misunderstanding with the Julian and Gregorian calendar systems, Champaud was the only athlete to participate for the nation as the rest of the Bulgarian delegation arrived three days late. The rest of the competitors were each paid 20 gold lev per day, and their second class travel expenses were reimbursed.

Champaud first competed in the men's vault event on 9 April at the Panathenaic Stadium; he placed fifth against fifteen other competitors. He then competed in the men's pommel horse event on the same day and placed somewhere between 3rd and 15th place. He last participated in the men's parallel bars event on 10 April in the same stadium and placed somewhere between third and eighteenth against seventeen other people. Champaud was also entered to compete in the men's pole vault on 10 April but eventually did not start in his event. It was then reported that he gained fame in Bulgaria due to his participation at the Summer Games, at times being called Charles Champov rather than his Swiss name.

In 1897, Champaud seriously injured his leg and was sent back to Switzerland for treatment. Nothing is known about his life after that. Various sources have listed Champaud as competing for either Bulgaria and Switzerland, though was considered as part of the Bulgarian delegation as he represented his gymnastics club in the country. In one instance, sports historian Raina Bardareva had found evidence that Champaud had represented the nation rather than the club. He was the first Bulgarian Olympian.
