= George Charles (disambiguation) =

George Charles (1916–2004) was a Saint Lucian politician.

George Charles may also refer to:

- George Charles of Hesse-Kassel (1691–1755)
- George Frederick Charles, Margrave of Brandenburg-Bayreuth (1688–1735), German prince

== See also ==
- Charles George (disambiguation)
