= Konrad Winkler =

Konrad Winkler can refer to:

- Konrad Winkler (skier) (born 1955), former East German skier
- Konrad Winkler (fencer) (1882–1962), Polish fencer
