= Kazimierz de Rostwo-Suski =

Polish equestrian

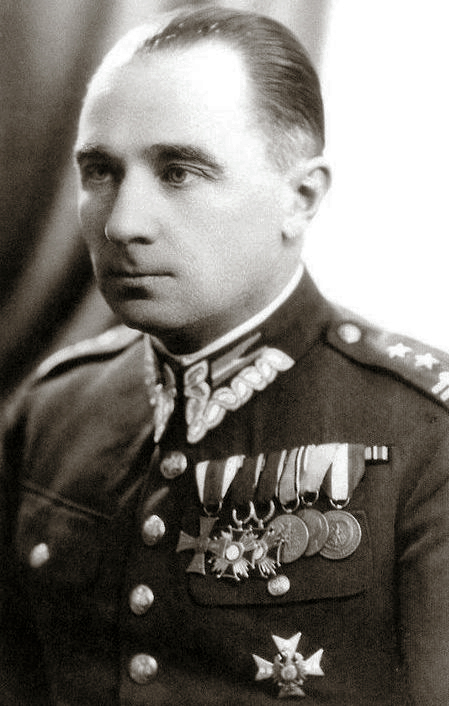

Personal information
- Nationality: Polish
- Born: 21 September 1891; Karpylivka, Volhynian Governorate, Russian Empire
- Died: 9 March 1974 (aged 82); Kraków, Poland

Sport
- Sport: Equestrian

Kazimierz de Rostwo-Suski (21 September 1891 – 9 March 1974) was a Polish equestrian. He competed in two events at the 1924 Summer Olympics.
