= Lars Ehrnrooth =

Finnish equestrian

Personal information
- Nationality: Finnish
- Born: 3 June 1897; Valkeala, Finland
- Died: 4 September 1980 (aged 83); Kirkkonummi, Finland

Sport
- Sport: Equestrian

Lars Ehrnrooth (3 June 1897 – 4 September 1980) was a Finnish equestrian. He competed in the individual eventing event at the 1924 Summer Olympics.
