= Adolf van der Voort van Zijp =

Dutch equestrian

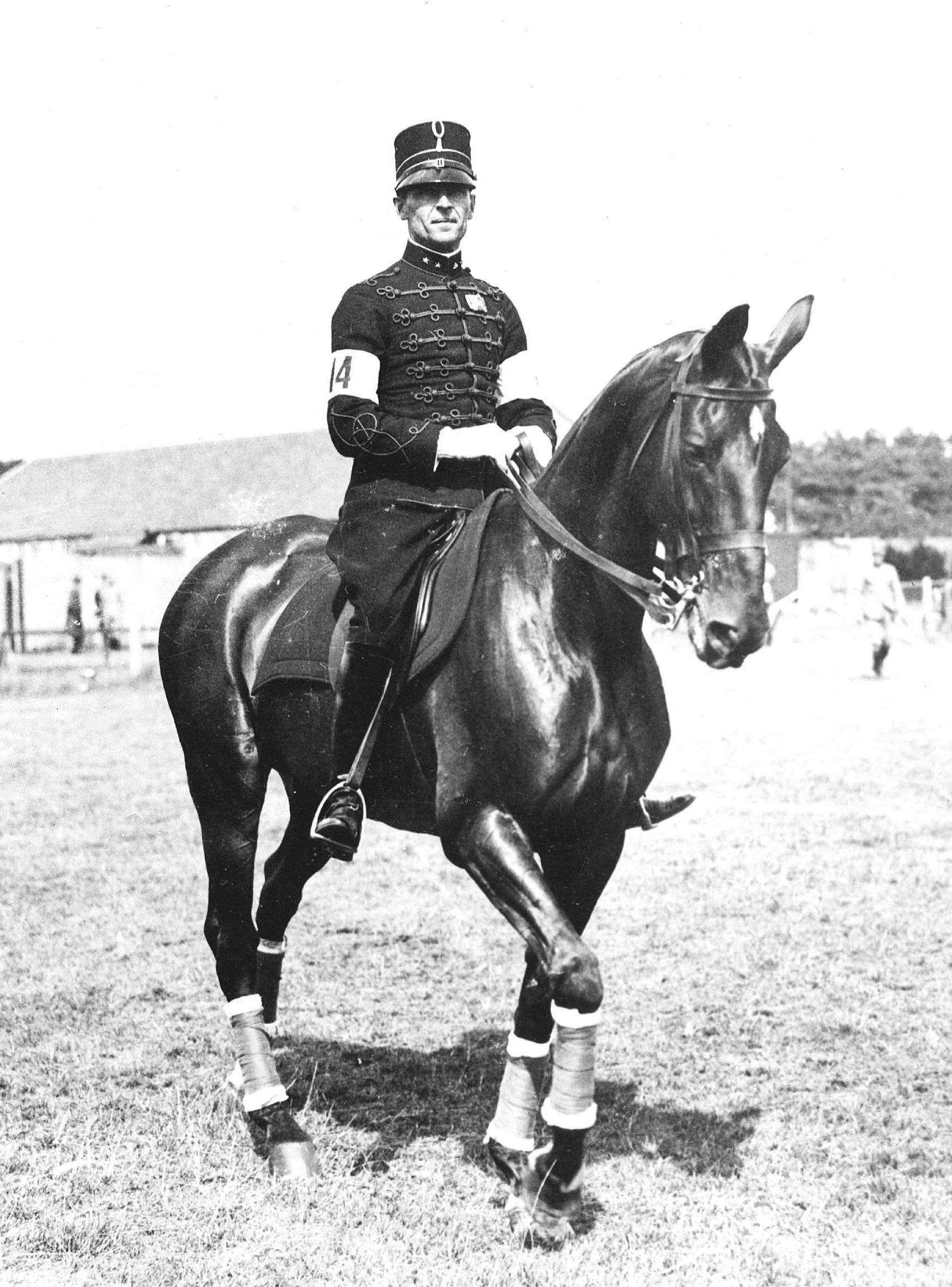

Medal record

Men's equestrian

Representing the Netherlands

Olympic Games
Gold medal – first place	1924 Paris	Individual Event
Gold medal – first place	1924 Paris	Team Event
Gold medal – first place	1928 Amsterdam	Team Event

Adolf van der Voort van Zijp (1 September 1892 in Klambir Lima, North Sumatra, Dutch East Indies – 8 March 1978 in Monaco) was a Dutch horse rider who competed in the 1924 Summer Olympics and in the 1928 Summer Olympics.

== Biography ==
Born into a Dutch patrician family, he was first and foremost a military man, and like the other members of his Olympic team he served in the Dutch armed forces. At the Olympic Games of 1924, he was a lieutenant in the Second Regiment of the Huzares. Eventually he would be promoted to Inspector of the Cavalry.

In the 1924 Summer Olympics he won the gold medal in the individual three-day event as well as in the team three-day event. Four years later he again won the gold medal in the team three-day event and placed fourth in the individual three-day event. His compatriot Charles Pahud de Mortanges was awarded the gold medal in the latter case.

In May 1940 Van der Voort van Zijp fought at the bloody battle of the Grebbeberg. After the German invasion of the Netherlands, he was imprisoned with other notables as a prisoner of war in Germany. Adolf van der Voort van Zijp died in Monaco on 8 March 1978.
