= Georges de Regibus =

Swiss athlete and sports teacher

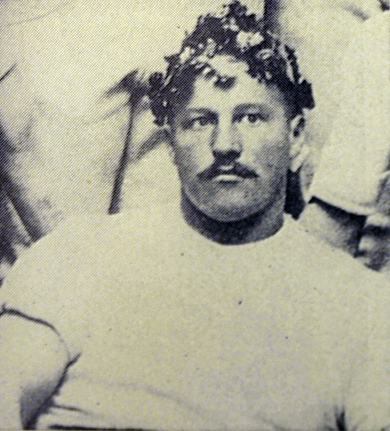
- Born: Georges de Regibus; August 14, 1867; Épalinges, Switzerland
- Died: November 7, 1927 (aged 60); Lausanne, Switzerland
- Occupation: Teacher
- Known for: Introduced association football to Bulgaria

Gymnastics career
- Discipline: Men's artistic gymnastics

Georges de Regibus (Bulgarian: Жорж дьо Режибюс) (14 August 1867 – 7 November 1927) was a Swiss athlete and sports teacher credited with introducing association football to Bulgaria in 1894.

== Biography ==
De Regibus was born in Épalinges, a commune in the canton of Vaud, part of French-speaking Switzerland. His father, Pierre de Regibus, was a descendant of an Italian family originally from Bologna. In 1889, de Regibus moved to Yverdon-les-Bains with his mother. In that city, he worked as a locksmith at the Jura–Simplon Railway carriage repair works while his mother earned money by selling chestnuts. In Yverdon, de Regibus got to be involved in various sports, most notably gymnastics, boxing and association football, and he soon received a federal gymnastics instructor's diploma. An acquaintance of de Regibus who played for Grasshoppers remembered him as a "quality goalkeeper". De Regibus' physique made him a suitable sportsman: of middle height, he had a very wide chest and appeared strong and thickset.

Georges de Regibus arrived in the Principality of Bulgaria in 1894. He came to that country along with nine other Swiss gymnastics teachers as part of a delegation of the Swiss Gymnastics Federation. The Swiss teachers had been invited during Bulgarian Minister of Education Georgi Zhivkov's visit to Lausanne in 1893 in order to familiarize Bulgarian people with formal physical education and organized sports. Other notable Swiss among these sports teachers were Charles Champaud, a teacher in Sofia regarded as the first person to represent Bulgaria at the Olympic Games (at the inaugural 1896 Summer Olympics), and Louis-Emil Eyer (1865–1919), a Bulgarophile who died as a Bulgarian Army soldier in World War I.

De Regibus was appointed as a teacher by the Varna High School for Boys on 13 May 1894. Having brought his personal leather football to Varna, he introduced football to his pupils of several different grades, which marked the first time that sport was practised in the country. This happened in the high school yard over a few days near the end of the 1893–94 school year, i.e. in late spring or early summer of 1894. De Regibus established football as a regular extracurricular activity, which was met with enthusiastic support by the pupils.

The Swiss teacher would pick out groups of 10–12 strong runners from two school classes and organize a football game between them. In the memories of Economic Life magazine editor and pupil Nikola Konstantinov, the earliest matches were contested between the 6th and 7th grades of the high school. He recalled that the leader and captain of the 7th grade team was Vasil Kolarov from Shumen who went on to become one of Bulgaria's chief communist politicians and Prime Minister of Bulgaria (1949–1950). While the first matches took place in the high school yard, later games were organized at various places in the fields around Varna, including an improvised pitch by the Black Sea coast where the Sea Garden was built a few years later. De Regibus was normally the referee of these school matches, though according to pupil and later professor Petar Petkov he would often join the game, doubling as a player.

De Regibus remained in Bulgaria until 12 July 1896, when his two-year teacher's contract expired. Upon returning to Switzerland in 1896, he opened a café in Treycovagnes and then another one in Yverdon. After that, he spent nearly two decades as a sports teacher in Egypt, though towards the end of World War I (1914–1918) he returned to Switzerland once more and settled in Lausanne. Georges de Regibus died in that city in late 1927; he was survived by his wife Louise, who died in 1941. The ashes of the two were placed in a common urn in the Lausanne crematory's chapel.
