= Valenzano railway station =

Railway station in Valenzano, Italy

Valenzano

General information
- Location: Valenzano, Bari, Apulia; Italy
- Coordinates: 41°02′34″N 16°52′45″E
- Owner: Ferrovie del Sud Est
- Line: Bari-Casamassima-Putignano railway
- Platforms: 2
- Train operators: Ferrovie del Sud Est
Location
- Location within Apulia

Valenzano is a railway station in Valenzano, Italy. The station is located on the Bari-Casamassima-Putignano railway. The train services and the railway infrastructure are operated by Ferrovie del Sud Est.

== Train services ==
The station is served by the following service(s):

- Local services (Treno regionale) Bari - Casamassima - Putignano
