= Hans Olof von Essen =

Finnish military and equestrian

Hans von Essen
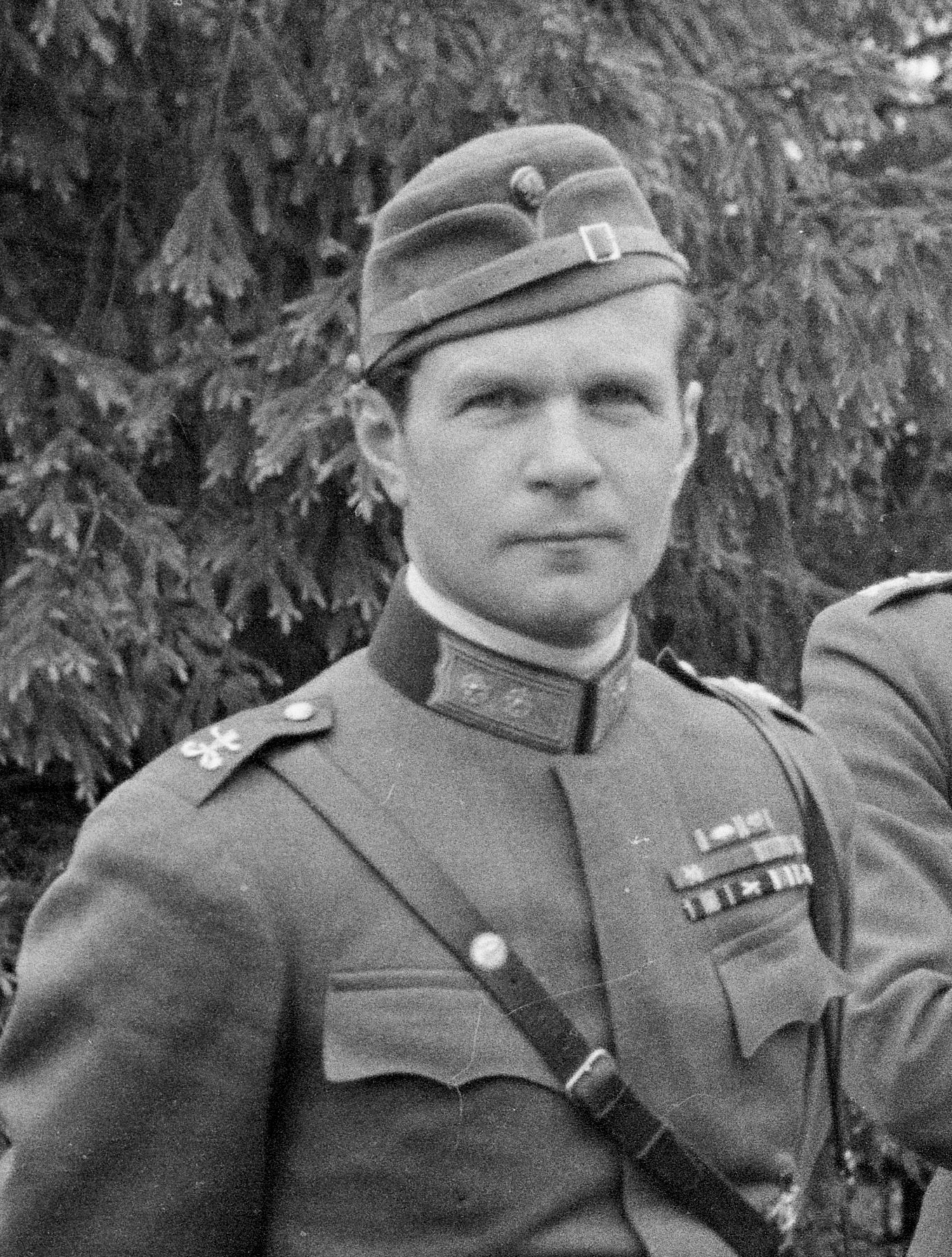
- Hans von Essen
- Born: 31 December 1900; Lappeenranta, Finland
- Died: 23 August 1973 (aged 72) Halikko, Finland
- Allegiance: Finnish
- Branch: Cavalry
- Service years: 1919–1946
- Rank: Colonel
- Awards: Mannerheim Cross; Cross of Liberty; Knight of the White Rose
- Other work: Equestrian

Hans Olof von Essen (31 December 1900 – 23 August 1973) was a Finnish military colonel and a Knight of the Mannerheim Cross.

Von Essen was also an equestrian. He competed in the individual eventing at the 1928 Summer Olympics.
