= Alec Tod =

British equestrian

Personal information
- Nationality: British
- Born: 2 May 1898; Sherborne, England
- Died: 17 November 1977 (aged 79); Swainswick, England

Sport
- Sport: Equestrian

Alec Tod (2 May 1898 – 17 November 1977) was a British equestrian. He competed in two events at the 1924 Summer Olympics.
