= Karpylivka =

Karpylivka Карпилівка
- Village
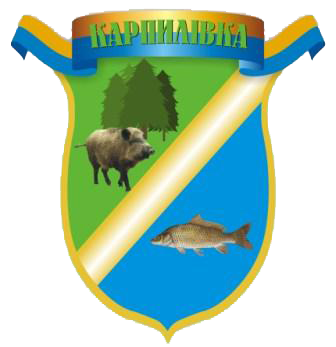
- Coat of arms

- Location of Karpylivka in Ukraine
- Coordinates: 51°24′38″N 26°42′19″E
- Country: Ukraine
- Oblast: Rivne Oblast
- District: Sarny Raion
- First mention: 1651
- Historical date of founding: 1700

Government
  - Chief of silrada (joint rural administration): Karpets Hanna Svyrydivna
- Elevation: 149 m (489 ft)

Population
  - Total: 2 276
  - Density: 12,644.44/km^{2} (32,748.9/sq mi)
- Time zone: UTC+2 (EET)
  - Summer (DST): UTC+3 (EEST)
- Postal code: 34513
- Area code: +380 3655
- Website: Карпилівка Онлайн (Karpylivka Online)

Karpylivka (Ukrainian: Карпилівка; Polish: Karpiłówka) — is a village in the Sarny Raion (district) of Rivne Oblast (province) in western Ukraine, center of silrada (rural council) with joint administration (includes settlement Strashiv, village Rudnia-Karpylivska). The villages population is 2,363, as per the 2021 census.
