= Asen Lekarski =

Bulgarian fencer

Personal information
- Born: 12 May 1901
- Died: 2 September 1952 (aged 51)

Sport
- Sport: Fencing

Asen Lekarski (Bulgarian: Асен Лекарски) (12 May 1901 – 2 September 1952) was a Bulgarian fencer. He competed in the individual sabre event at the 1928 Summer Olympics.
