= Léon Rigon =

French equestrian

Personal information
- Nationality: French
- Born: 19 August 1885
- Died: 3 July 1979 (aged 93)

Sport
- Sport: Equestrian

Léon Rigon (19 August 1885 – 3 July 1979) was a French equestrian. He competed in two events at the 1924 Summer Olympics.
