= Joseph Fallon =

Belgian equestrian

Personal information
- Nationality: Belgian
- Born: 4 December 1896
- Died: 16 February 1977 (aged 80)

Sport
- Sport: Equestrian

Joseph Fallon (4 December 1896 – 16 February 1977) was a Belgian equestrian. He competed in two events at the 1924 Summer Olympics.
