= Vernon Padgett =

American equestrian

Personal information
- Born: January 26, 1894 Walterboro, South Carolina, United States
- Died: April 21, 1964 (aged 70) Walterboro, South Carolina, United States

Sport
- Sport: Equestrian

Vernon Padgett (January 26, 1894 – April 21, 1964) was an American equestrian. He competed in four events at the 1924 Summer Olympics.
