= Keith Hervey =

British equestrian

Personal information
- Nationality: British
- Born: 3 November 1898; Fulham, England
- Died: 22 February 1973 (aged 74); Sporle, England

Sport
- Sport: Equestrian

Keith Hervey (3 November 1898 – 22 February 1973) was a British equestrian. He competed in four events at the 1924 Summer Olympics.
