= Gerard de Kruijff =

Dutch equestrian (1890–1968)

Olympic medal record

Men's equestrian

Representing the Netherlands
| Gold medal – first place | 1924 Paris | Team 3 day event |
| Gold medal – first place | 1928 Amsterdam | Team 3 day event |
| Silver medal – second place | 1928 Amsterdam | Individual 3 day event |

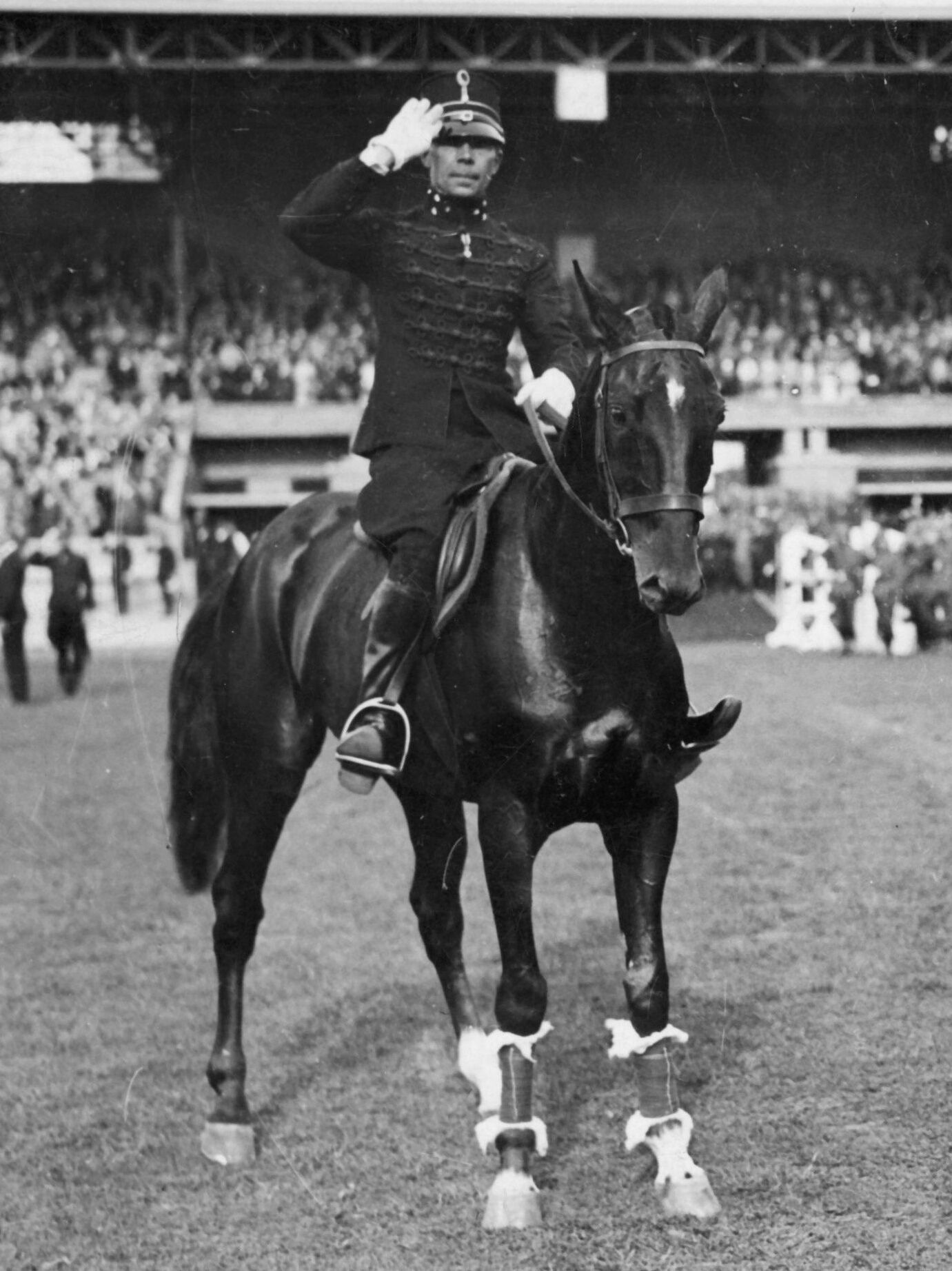
G.P. de Kruijff (1928)

Gerard Pieter de Kruijff (27 January 1890 in Buren – 16 October 1968 in Deventer) was a Dutch horse rider who competed in the 1924 Summer Olympics and in the 1928 Summer Olympics.

In the 1924 Summer Olympics he won the gold medal in the team three-day event and placed thirteenth in the individual three-day event. Four years later he won again the gold medals in the team three-day event and in the individual three-day event he won the silver medal. In Amsterdam he also competed in the jumping events. In the individual jumping he finished in 27th place and the Dutch team placed tenth in the team jumping competition.
