= Hans Bühler =

Hans E. Bühler (12 April 1893 – 1 June 1967) was a Swiss horse rider who competed in the 1924 Summer Olympics.

In 1924 he and his horse Sailor Boy won the silver medal as part of the Swiss team in the team jumping competition, after finishing twentieth in the individual jumping event. He and his horse Mikosch also participated in the individual eventing and finished 14th. As member of the Swiss eventing team they finished fourth in the team eventing.
