= Georges Van der Ton =

Belgian equestrian (1898–1955)

Georges Maurice Janvier Van Derton
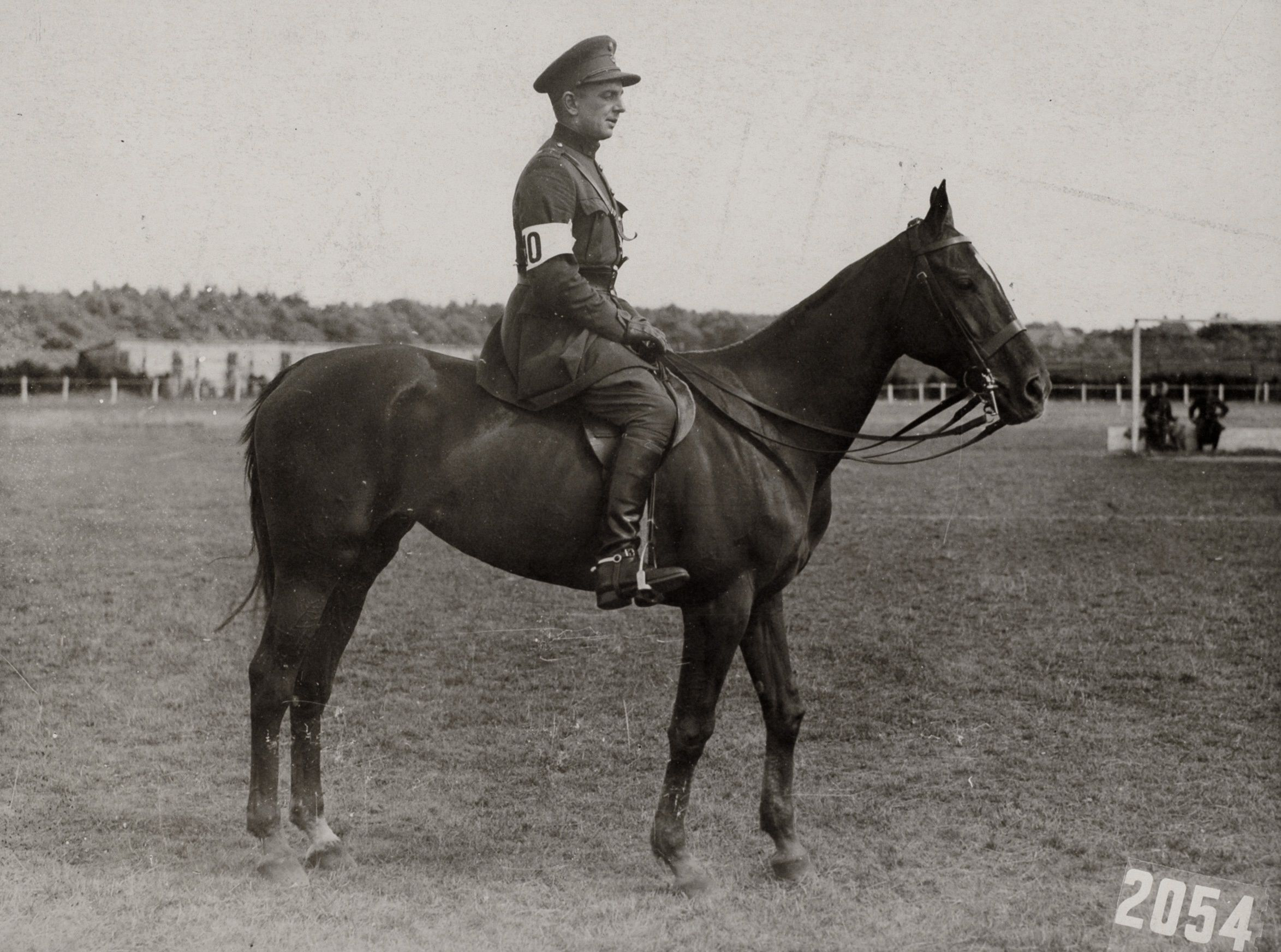

Personal information
- Nationality: Belgian
- Born: 1 January 1898; Brussels, Belgium
- Died: 20 September 1955 (aged 57); Brussels, Belgium

Sport
- Sport: Equestrian

Georges Van Derton (1 January 1898 – 20 September 1955) was a Belgian equestrian. He competed in two events at the 1928 Summer Olympics.
