= Claës König =

Swedish equestrian (1885–1961)

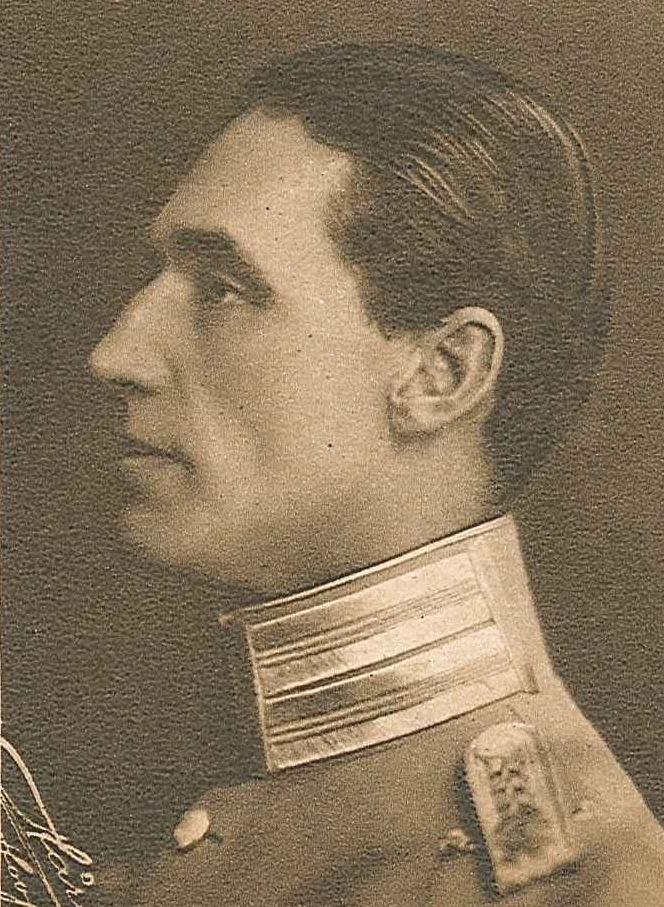

Medal record

Men's Equestrian
Gold medal – first place	1920 Antwerp	Team jumping
Silver medal – second place	1924 Paris	Team eventing

Claës Henrik Magnus König (15 January 1885 – 25 November 1961) was a Swedish nobleman, officer, Crown Equerry (1935–1946) and horse rider, who competed in the 1920 Summer Olympics and in the 1924 Summer Olympics.

He was born to Swedish Chamberlain Eric König and his wife, Countess Louise Wrangel.

In 1920, he and his horse Tresor were part of the Swedish equestrian team, which won the gold medal in the team jumping event in Antwerp. Four years later, he and his horse Bojar won the silver medal with the Swedish eventing team after finishing fifth in the individual eventing in Paris.

Court offices
Preceded by Carl Bonde	Crown Equerry; 1935–1946	Succeeded by Hodder Stjernswärd
