= Ottó Binder =

Hungarian equestrian

Personal information
- Nationality: Hungarian
- Born: 14 May 1889; Mediaș, Austria-Hungary
- Died: 27 November 1951 (aged 62)

Sport
- Sport: Equestrian

Ottó Binder (14 May 1889 – 27 November 1951) was a Hungarian equestrian. He competed in two events at the 1928 Summer Olympics.
