= Josef Seyfried =

Czech equestrian

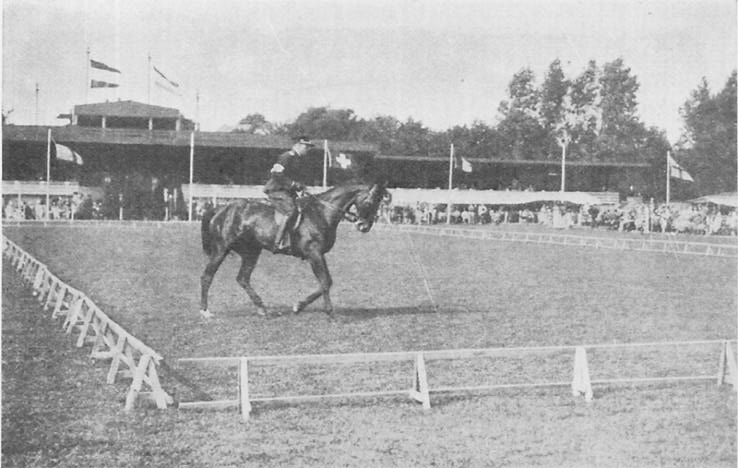

Personal information
- Nationality: Czech
- Born: 7 October 1895; Prague, Austria-Hungary
- Died: 19 December 1956 (aged 61); Hostouň, Czechoslovakia

Sport
- Sport: Equestrian

Josef Seyfried (7 October 1895 – 19 December 1956) was a Czech equestrian. He competed at the 1928 Summer Olympics and the 1936 Summer Olympics.
