= Gustaf Hagelin =

Swedish equestrian (1897–1983)

Olympic medal record

Men's Equestrian
Silver medal – second place	1924 Paris	Team eventing

Gustaf "Gösta" Wilhelm Hagelin (5 October 1897 – 13 December 1983) was a Swedish Army officer and horse rider who competed in the 1924 Summer Olympics. In 1924 he and his horse Varius won the silver medal with the Swedish eventing team after finishing twentieth in the individual eventing.

Hagelin was lieutenant colonel in the Swedish Army.
