= Alberto Lombardi =

Italian equestrian (1893–1975)

Medal record

Men's Equestrian

Representing Italy

Olympic Games
Bronze medal – third place	1924 Paris	Team eventing

Alberto Lombardi (29 August 1893 – 11 April 1975) was an Italian horse rider who competed in the 1924 Summer Olympics. In 1924 he and his horse Pimplo won the bronze medal in the team eventing competition, after finishing eleventh in the individual eventing.
