= José María Cabanillas =

Spanish equestrian

Personal information
- Nationality: Spanish
- Born: 28 October 1892; Valencia, Spain

Sport
- Sport: Equestrian

José María Cabanillas (born 28 October 1892, date of death unknown) was a Spanish equestrian. He competed in two events at the 1928 Summer Olympics.
