= Francisco Jiménez (equestrian) =

Spanish equestrian

Personal information
- Nationality: Spanish
- Born: 18 December 1893; Las Palmas, Spain
- Died: 6 May 1973 (aged 79); Montilla, Spain

Sport
- Sport: Equestrian

Francisco Jiménez (18 December 1893 – 6 May 1973) was a Spanish equestrian. He competed in two events at the 1928 Summer Olympics.
