= Antonius Colenbrander =

Dutch equestrian

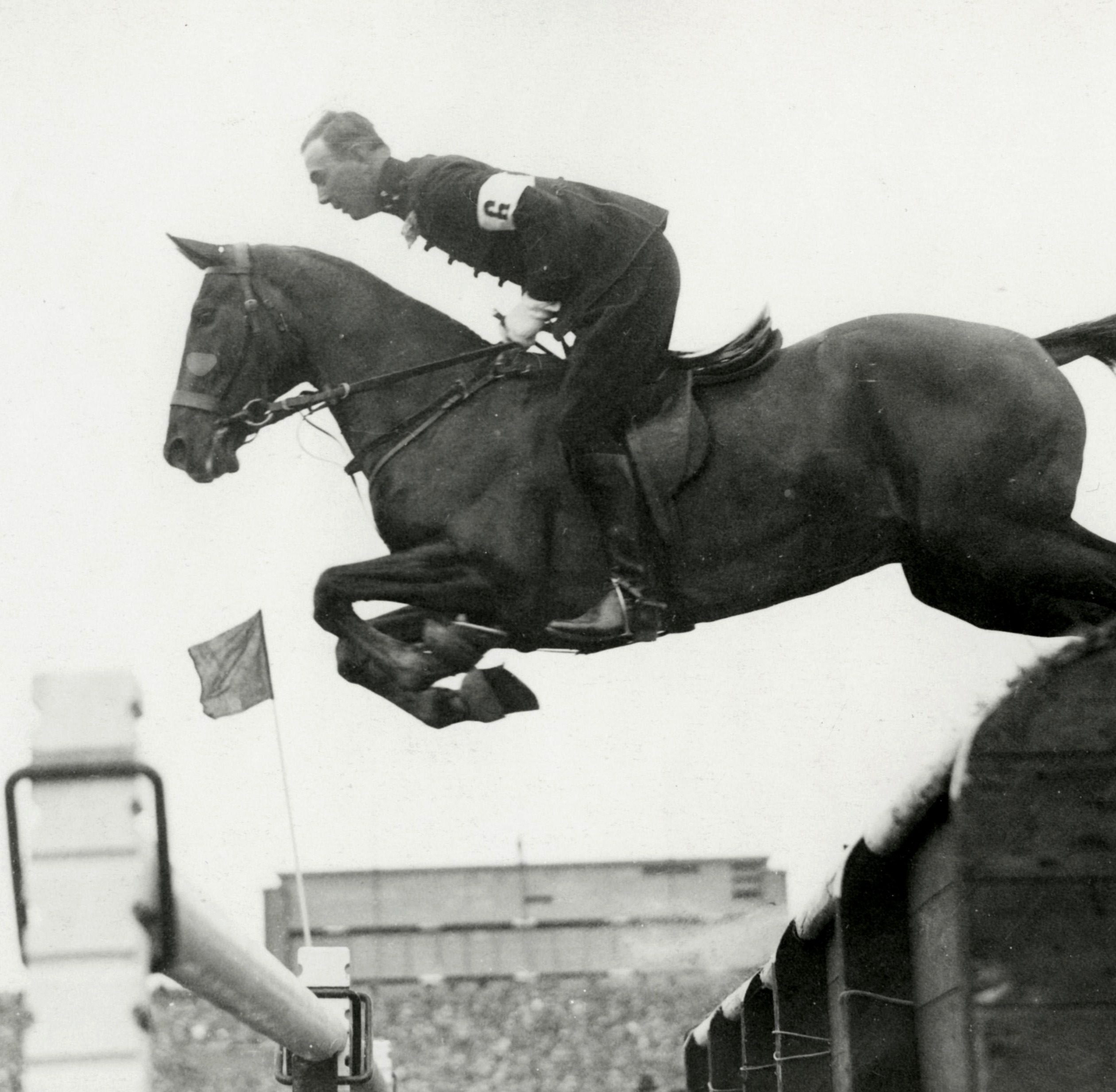
- Antonius Colenbrander with Gaga at the 1928 Olympics

Personal information
- Born: 3 May 1889 Meester Cornelis, Batavia, Dutch East Indies
- Died: 24 September 1929 (aged 40) Arnhem, the Netherlands

Sport
- Sport: Horse riding
Medal record
Representing the Netherlands
Olympic Games
Gold medal – first place	1924 Paris	Team 3 day event

Antonius Theodorus Colenbrander (3 May 1889 – 24 September 1929) was a Dutch horse rider. He competed at the 1924 Summer Olympics in the three-days event and at the 1928 Summer Olympics in jumping and won a gold medal with the Dutch team in 1924. He died after a bad fall from his horse at a jumping competition in Zelhem.
