= François Denis de Rivoyre =

French equestrian

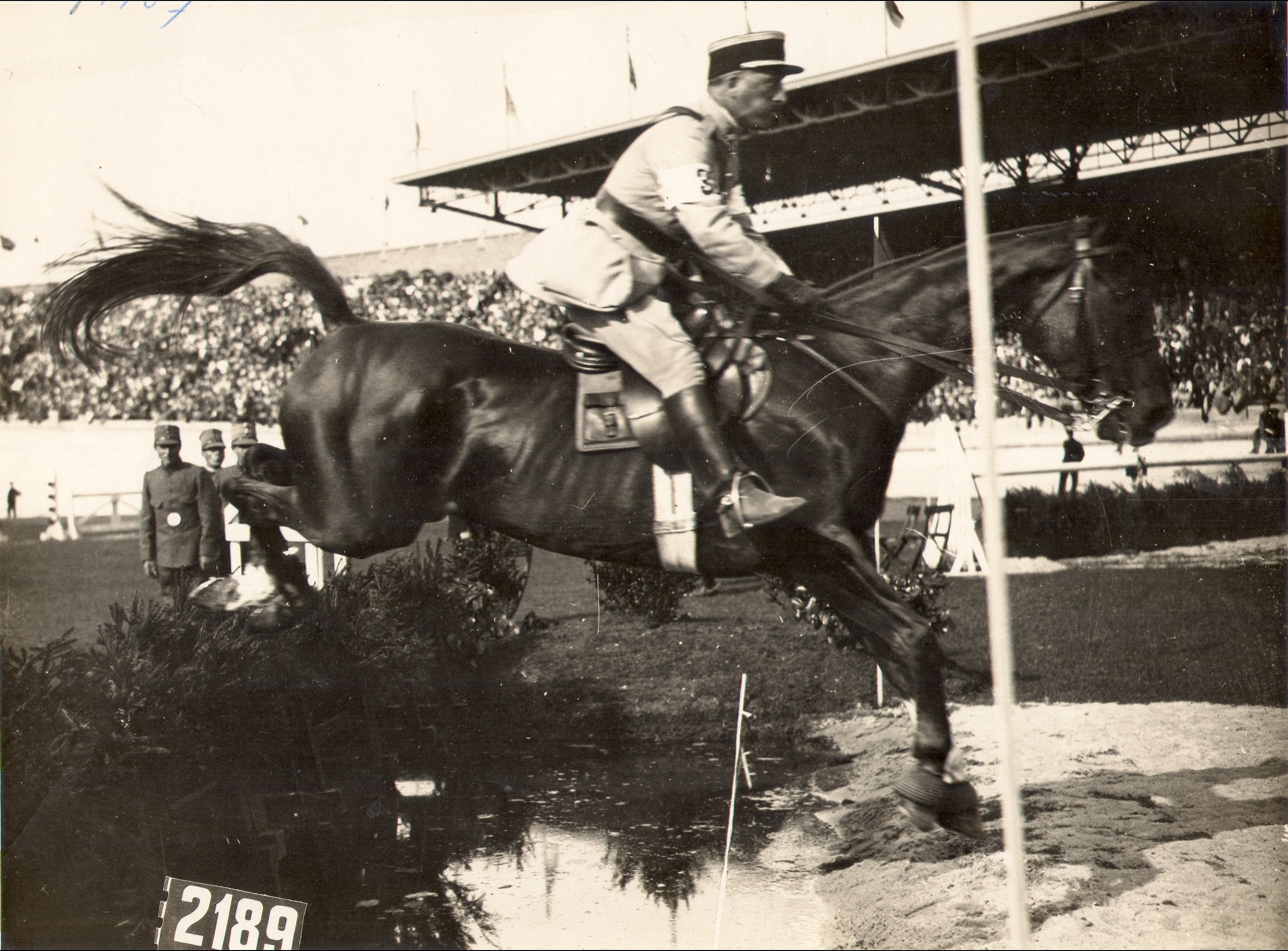
- François Denis de Rivoyre in 1928

Personal information
- Nationality: French
- Born: 1 May 1884; Vernon, France
- Died: 29 December 1946 (aged 62); Onesse-et-Laharie, France

Sport
- Sport: Equestrian

François Denis de Rivoyre (1 May 1884 – 29 December 1946) was a French equestrian. He competed in two events at the 1928 Summer Olympics.
