= Todor Yonchev =

Bulgarian teacher and public figure

- Born: 9 December 1859; Lom, Ottoman Empire
- Died: 2 November 1940 (aged 80); Sofia, Bulgaria
- Occupation: Teacher.

Todor Yonchev was a Bulgarian teacher and public figure, born on December 9, 1859, in the town of Lom, Bulgaria

== Biography ==
He graduated from the Pedagogical Academy of Vienna, Austria in 1881, after which he returned to Bulgaria and became a teacher of chemistry and gymnastics in Shumen. In 1888 he graduated from the chemical and agricultural department of Zurich Polytechnic in Zurich, Switzerland. After his return to Bulgaria he was a teacher in Sadovo and Sofia, as well as a school inspector in Pirdop. Until 1916 he worked in the Ministry of Public Education .

In 1890 Todor Vlaykov and Todor Yonchev founded the first Bulgarian cooperative - "Mirkovo Mutual Savings Agricultural Association" Oralo" in Mirkovo.

Todor Yonchev was one of the founders of modern physical education in Bulgaria. As a teacher in Sofia in 1895 he founded the first Gymnastics Society "Hero". He was also the initiator of the establishment of the Union of Bulgarian Gymnastics Societies "Hero" in 1898. He was elected to the board of the union as a clerk.

He was the head of the Bulgarian delegation for the 1896 Olympic Games in Athens.
