= Baudouin de Brabandère =

Belgian equestrian

Personal information
- Nationality: Belgian
- Born: 19 February 1894; Ixelles, Belgium
- Died: 22 July 1947 (aged 53); Namur, Belgium

Sport
- Sport: Equestrian

Baudouin de Brabandère (19 February 1894 – 22 July 1947) was a Belgian equestrian. He competed at the 1924 Summer Olympics and the 1928 Summer Olympics.
