= Emmanuel-Marie Longin Spindler =

French equestrian

Personal information
- Nationality: French
- Born: 4 September 1879; Montbéliard, France
- Died: 25 July 1961 (aged 81); Taxenne, France

Sport
- Sport: Equestrian

Emmanuel-Marie Longin Spindler (4 September 1879 – 25 July 1961) was a French equestrian. He competed in two events at the 1928 Summer Olympics.
