= Torsten Sylvan =

Swedish equestrian

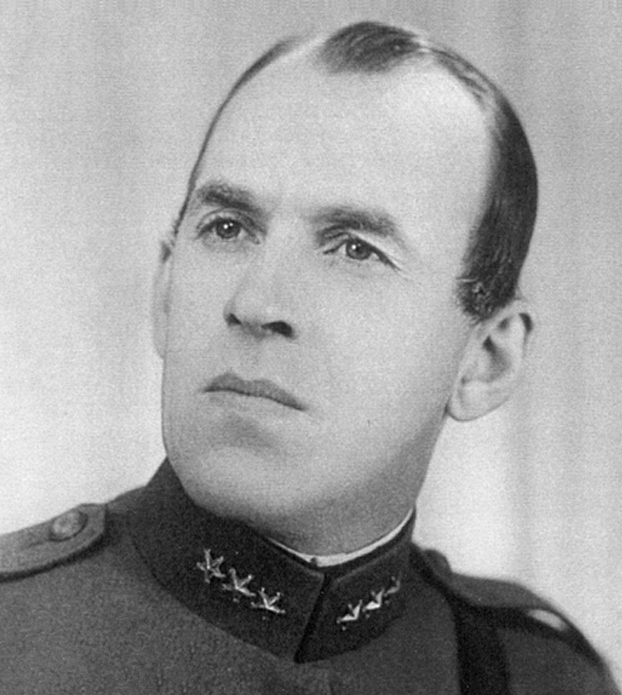

Personal information
- Born: 28 January 1895 Visby, Sweden
- Died: 26 April 1970 (aged 75) Stockholm, Sweden

Sport
- Sport: Horse riding
- Club: Ing2 IF, Eksjö
Medal record
Representing Sweden
Olympic Games
Silver medal – second place	1924 Paris	Team eventing

Carl Torsten Leopold Sylvan (28 January 1895 – 26 April 1970) was a Swedish Army officer and horse rider who competed in the 1924 Summer Olympics. He and his horse Anita finished ninth in the individual eventing and won a silver medal with the Swedish eventing team.

Sylvan became major in the reserve in 1940.

== Awards and decorations ==
- Knight of the Order of the Sword
- Knight of the Order of the White Rose of Finland
