= Alessandro Alvisi =

Italian equestrian

Medal record

Men's Equestrian

Representing Italy

Olympic Games
Bronze medal – third place	1920 Antwerp	Team jumping
Bronze medal – third place	1924 Paris	Team eventing

Alessandro Alvisi (12 February 1887 – 9 May 1951) was an Italian horse rider who competed in the 1920 Summer Olympics and in the 1924 Summer Olympics. In 1920 he and his horse Raggio di Sole won the bronze medal in the team jumping event. Four years later he and his horse Capiligio won the bronze medal in the team eventing after finishing twelfth in the individual eventing competition.
