= Victor Ankarcrona =

Swedish equestrian

Personal information
- Nationality: Swedish
- Born: 22 March 1896; Stockholm, Sweden
- Died: 11 March 1986 (aged 89); Stockholm, Sweden

Sport
- Sport: Equestrian

Victor Ankarcrona (22 March 1896 – 11 March 1986) was a Swedish equestrian. He competed at the 1924 Summer Olympics and the 1928 Summer Olympics.
