= Angelio Somalo =

Spanish equestrian

Personal information
- Nationality: Spanish
- Born: 16 October 1896

Sport
- Sport: Equestrian

Angelio Somalo (born 16 October 1896, date of death unknown) was a Spanish equestrian. He competed in two events at the 1928 Summer Olympics.
