= Emanuele Beraudo di Pralormo =

Italian equestrian (1887–1960)

- Born: 13 July 1887; Pralormo, Kingdom of Italy
- Died: 11 October 1960 (aged 73); Pralormo, Italy
- Military career
- Allegiance: Kingdom of Italy
- Branch: Royal Italian Army
- Rank: Generale di Corpo d'Armata
- Commands: 47th Infantry Division
- Conflicts: World War I World War II: East Africa Campaign; Italian Campaign
- Awards: Gold Medal of Military Valor

Olympic medal record

Representing Italy

Men's Equestrian
| Bronze medal – third place | 1924 Paris | Team eventing |

Emanuele Beraudo, Conte di Pralormo (13 July 1887 – 11 October 1960) was an Italian horse rider who competed in the 1924 Summer Olympics. He was born and died in Pralormo, Turin, Italy. He also served as a general in the Royal Italian Army during World War II.

== Biography ==
In 1924, Beraudo and his horse Mount Félix won the bronze medal in the team eventing competition after finishing 17th in the individual eventing.

He also participated in the individual jumping event with his horse Sido, but they were eliminated. The other three Italian riders finished fifth in the team jumping event.
