= Nils Kettner =

Swedish equestrian

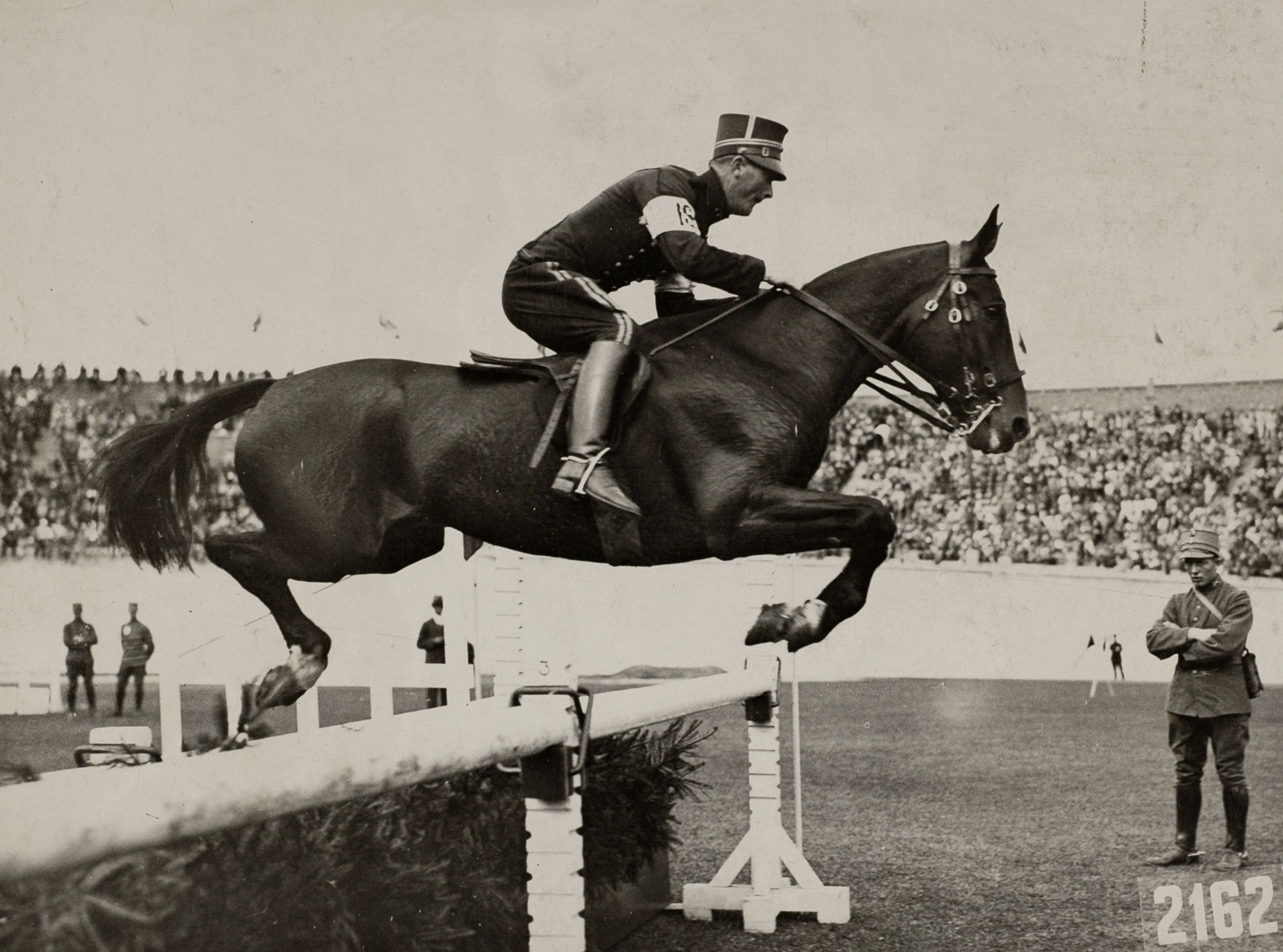
- Nils Kettner in 1928

Personal information
- Nationality: Swedish
- Born: 6 January 1898 Skärplinge, Sweden
- Died: 15 April 1967 (aged 69) Nacka, Sweden

Sport
- Sport: Equestrian

Nils Kettner (6 January 1898 – 15 April 1967) was a Swedish equestrian during the 1920s and 1930s.

== Biography ==
=== Personal life ===
Kettner lived in Uppland. He served as a lieutenant at the Royal Uppland Artillery Regiment. After being engaged to Ester Kronberg in 1923, the married on 27 June 1925.

=== Career ===
Already in the early 1920s Kettner competed with horse "Cesar". But he won also prizes on other horses.

He competed in two events at the 1928 Summer Olympics. He continued competing with Caesar in the 1930s.
