= Louis Rousseaux =

Belgian equestrian (born 1900)

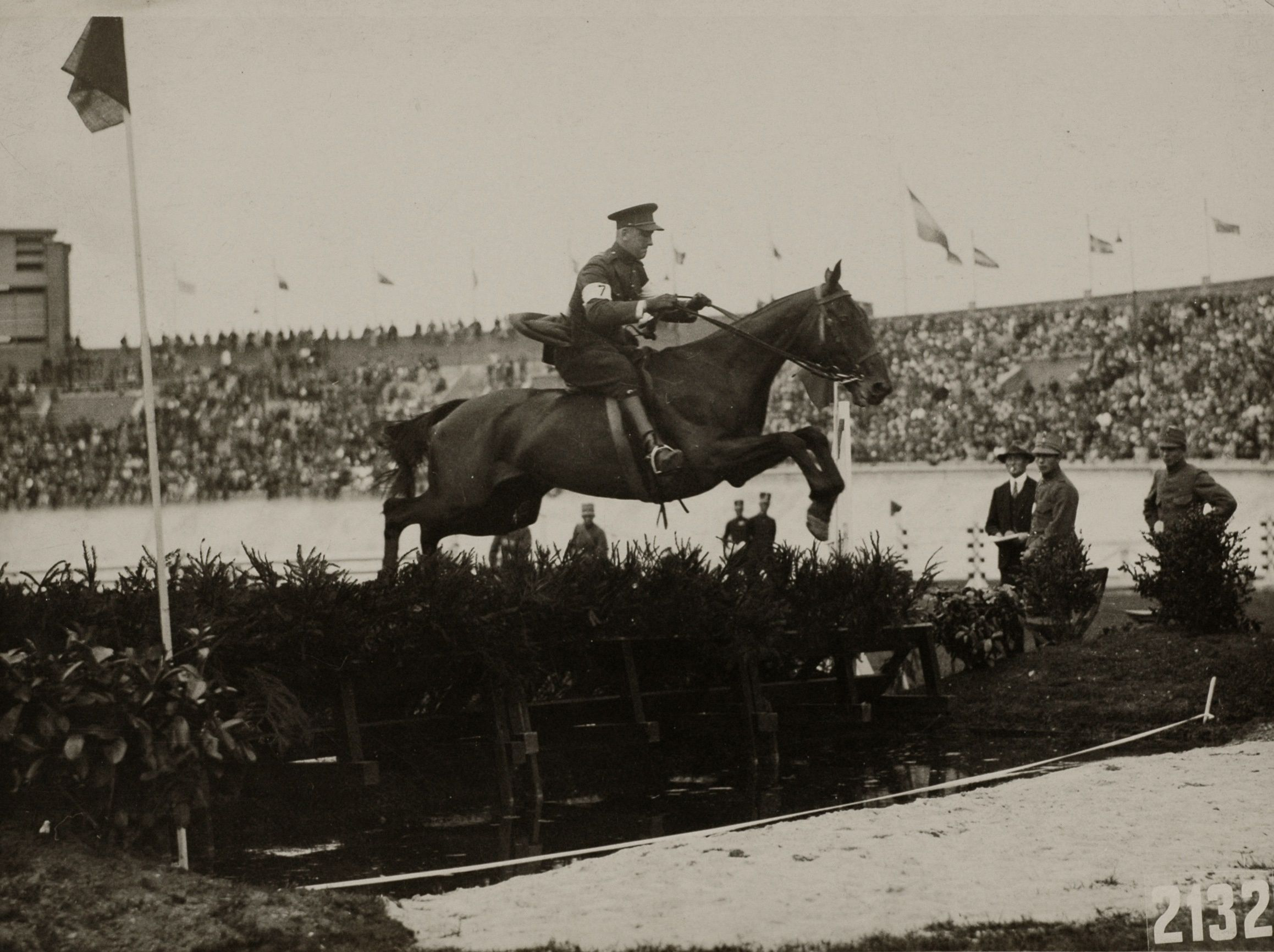

Personal information
- Nationality: Belgian
- Born: 26 July 1900

Sport
- Sport: Equestrian

Louis Rousseaux (born 26 July 1900, date of death unknown) was a Belgian equestrian. He competed in two events at the 1928 Summer Olympics.
