= Bruno Neumann =

German military officer and equestrian

Olympic medal record

Men's Equestrian
Bronze medal – third place	1928 Amsterdam	Individual eventing

Bruno Neumann (26 April 1883 – 31 December 1943) was a German officer and horse rider who competed in the 1928 Summer Olympics.

In 1928, he and his horse Ilja won the bronze medal in the individual eventing competition. The German eventing team did not finish the team eventing competition, because only two riders were able to finish the individual competition.
