= Matěj Pechman =

Czech equestrian

Personal information
- Nationality: Czech
- Born: 24 May 1893; Plzeň, Austria-Hungary
- Died: 24 October 1973 (aged 80); Malechov, Czechoslovakia

Sport
- Sport: Equestrian

Matěj Pechman (24 May 1893 – 24 October 1973) was a Czech equestrian. He competed at the 1924 Summer Olympics and the 1936 Summer Olympics.
