= Polepy (Kolín District) =

- Municipality
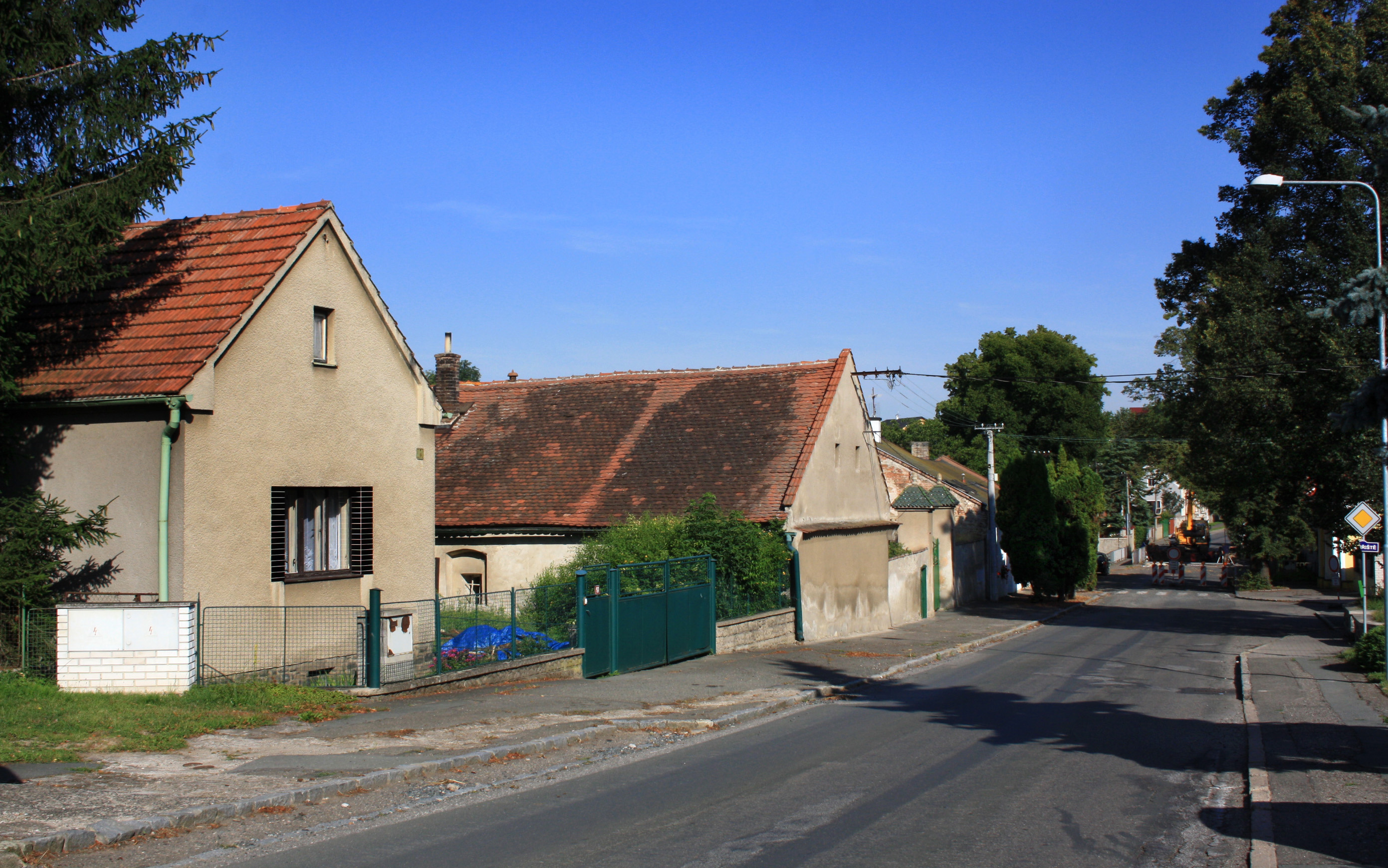
- Main street

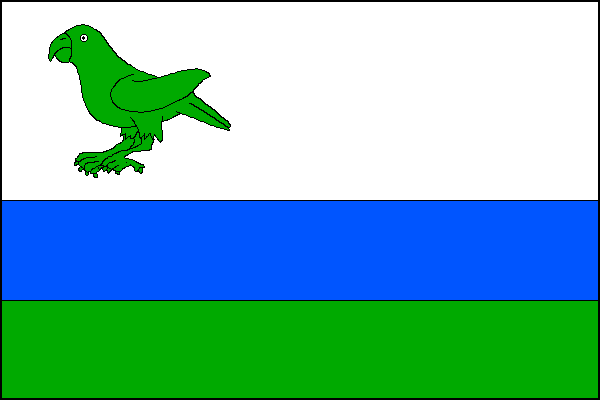
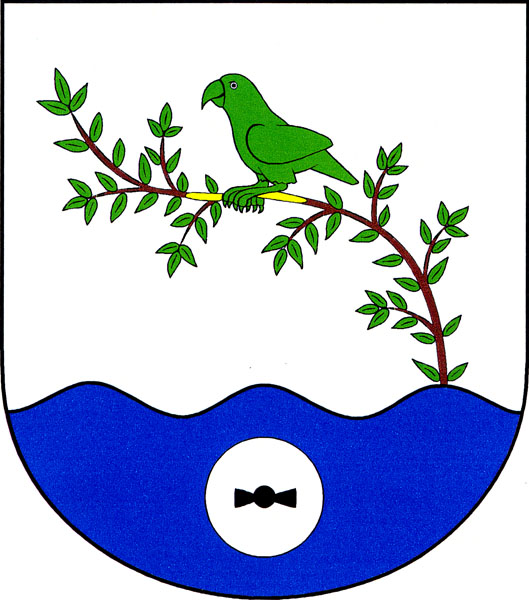
- Flag Coat of arms

- Location in the Czech Republic
- Coordinates: 50°0′17″N 15°12′22″E
- Country: Czech Republic
- Region: Central Bohemian
- District: Kolín
- First mentioned: 1343

Area
  - Total: 2.42 km^{2} (0.93 sq mi)
- Elevation: 212 m (696 ft)

Population (2026-01-01)
  - Total: 649
  - Density: 268/km^{2} (695/sq mi)
- Time zone: UTC+1 (CET)
  - Summer (DST): UTC+2 (CEST)
- Postal code: 280 02
- Website: www.obecpolepy.cz

Polepy is a municipality and village in Kolín District in the Central Bohemian Region of the Czech Republic. It has about 600 inhabitants.

== Demographics ==
Historical population
Year	Pop.	±%
1869	306	—
1880	343	+12.1%
1890	327	−4.7%
1900	330	+0.9%
1910	385	+16.7%
1921	398	+3.4%
1930	395	−0.8%
1950	374	−5.3%
1961	396	+5.9%
1970	369	−6.8%
1980	367	−0.5%
1991	515	+40.3%
2001	542	+5.2%
2011	599	+10.5%
2021	654	+9.2%
Source: Censuses
