= Michel Artola =

French equestrian

Personal information
- Nationality: French
- Born: 21 February 1882 Saint-Jean-de-Luz, France
- Died: 25 March 1936 (aged 54) Ainhoa, France

Sport
- Sport: Equestrian

Michel Artola (21 February 1882 – 25 March 1936) was a French equestrian. He competed at the 1920 Summer Olympics and the 1924 Summer Olympics.
