= Carl Gustaf Lewenhaupt =

Swedish equestrian (1884–1935)

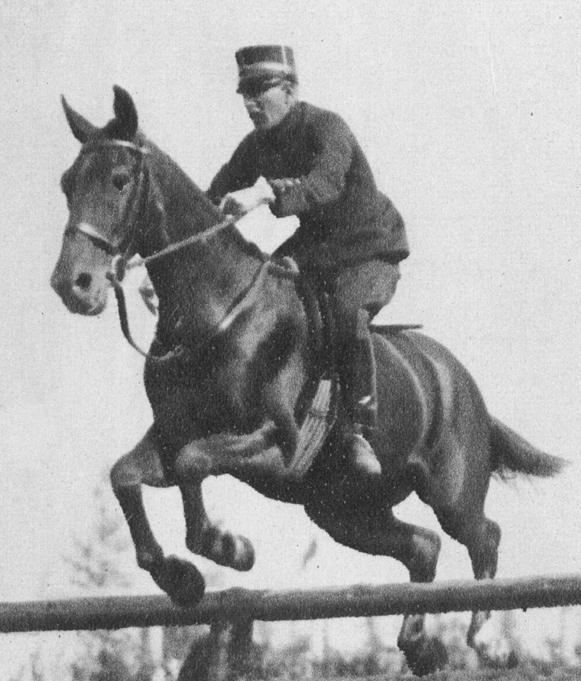
- Lewenhaupt in the 1920s

Personal information
- Born: 7 January 1884 Örebro, Sweden
- Died: 11 May 1935 (aged 51) Stockholm, Sweden

Sport
- Sport: Horse riding
- Club: K2 IF, Helsingborg
Medal record
Representing Sweden
Olympic Games
| Bronze medal – third place | 1920 Antwerp | Individual jumping |

Carl Gustaf Moritz Thure Lewenhaupt (7 January 1884 – 11 May 1935) was a Swedish equestrian who competed in the 1920 and 1924 Summer Olympics. In 1920 he won a bronze medal in the individual jumping event. In 1924, he was a non-scoring member of the Swedish team that won a silver medal in team three-day eventing; he failed to finish his individual routine.

== Biography ==
Lewenhaupt came from a noble family and was the son of Count Carl-Johan Lewenhaupt. In 1904, he became a second lieutenant in a King's dragoons regiment and was promoted to lieutenant in 1906. After completing his studies at the National Defence College in 1909-11 and at the French Riding School in Saumur he briefly served in the Belgian army in 1913, though his main appointment was with the General Staff, where he served in 1912-14 and 1916–22, reaching the rank of captain in 1917. After that, he headed the Swedish railway police and co-founded the Brunkeberg Club, a Swedish nationalist political association.

In parallel with his military activities, Lewenhaupt served as a sports functionary, serving as the secretary of a jockey club. As a member of the Swedish Olympic Committee, he represented Sweden at the Olympic Congresses in Lausanne and Paris.
