= Louis-Marie de Jonghe d'Ardoye =

Belgian equestrian

Personal information
- Nationality: Belgian
- Born: 11 July 1900
- Died: 5 September 1929 (aged 29)

Sport
- Sport: Equestrian

Louis-Marie de Jonghe d'Ardoye (11 July 1900 – 5 September 1929) was a Belgian equestrian. He competed in two events at the 1928 Summer Olympics.
