= Alfréd von Adda =

Hungarian equestrian (1888–1980)

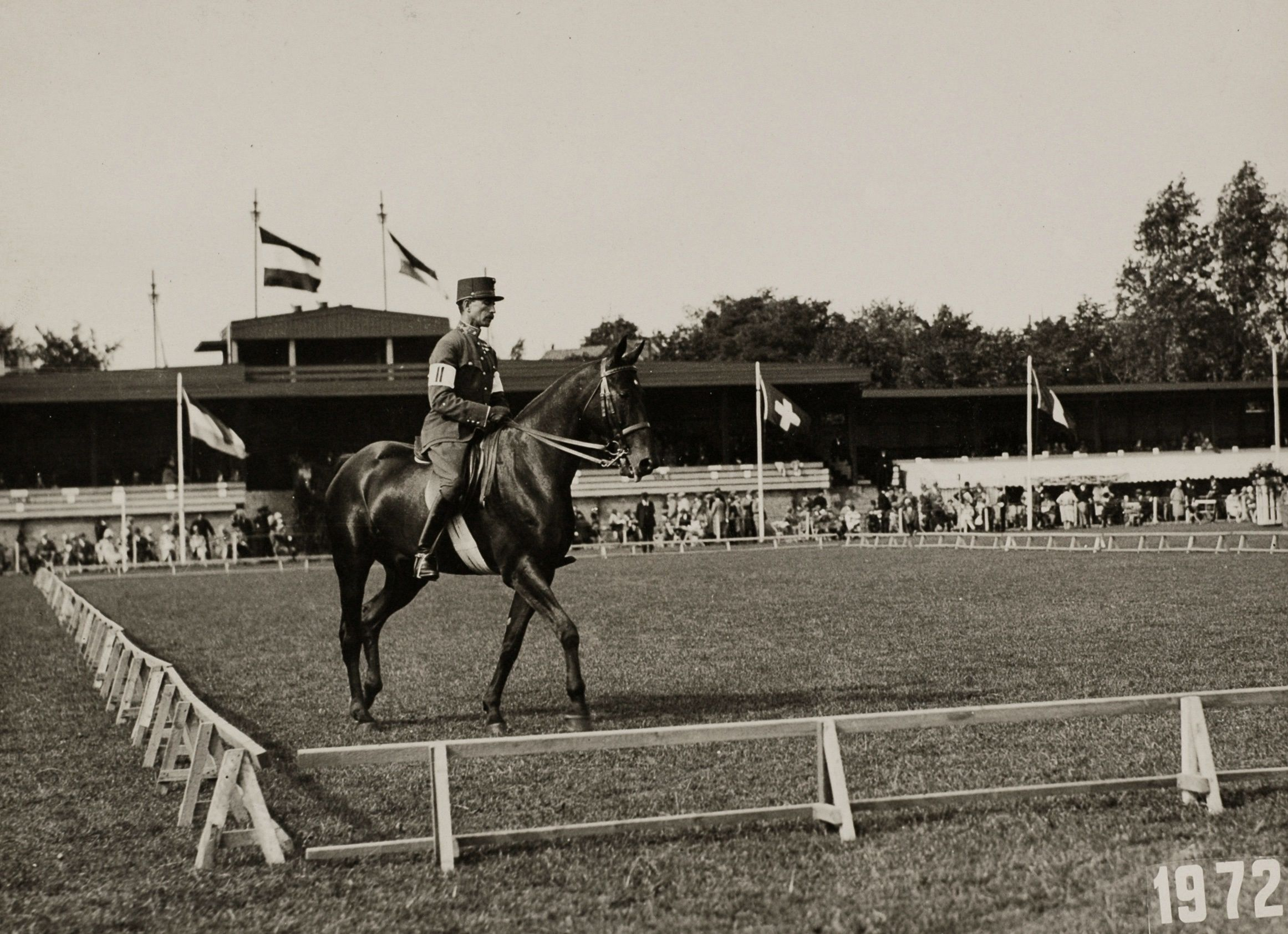
- Alfréd von Adda in 1928

Personal information
- Nationality: Hungarian
- Born: 29 August 1888 Sibiu, Austria-Hungary
- Died: 1 January 1980 (aged 91) Bolzano, Italy

Sport
- Sport: Equestrian

Alfréd von Adda (29 August 1888 – 1 January 1980) was a Hungarian equestrian. He competed in two events at the 1928 Summer Olympics.
