= Eugenio Cerboneschi =

Italian equestrian

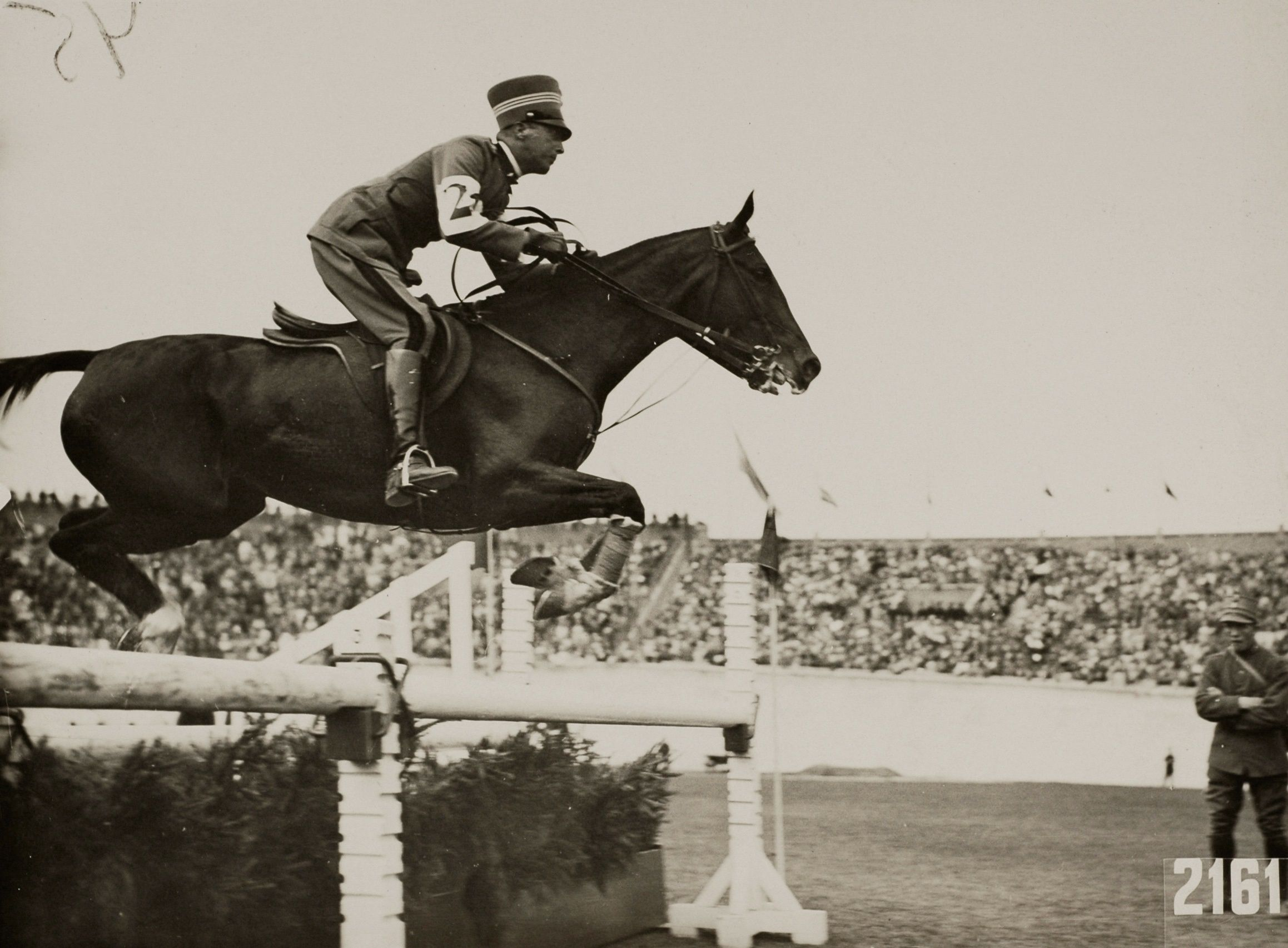

Personal information
- Nationality: Italian
- Born: 15 January 1889; Casale Marittimo, Kingdom of Italy
- Died: 15 July 1955 (aged 66); Valenza, Italy

Sport
- Sport: Equestrian

Eugenio Cerboneschi (15 January 1889 – 15 July 1955) was an Italian equestrian. He competed in two events at the 1928 Summer Olympics.
