= Werner Fehr (equestrian) =

Swiss equestrian

Personal information
- Nationality: Swiss
- Born: 1885
- Died: 6 October 1963 (aged 77–78); Nussbaumen, Switzerland

Sport
- Sport: Equestrian

Werner Fehr (1885 – 6 October 1963) was a Swiss equestrian. He competed in two events at the 1924 Summer Olympics.
