= Willy Gerber =

Swiss equestrian

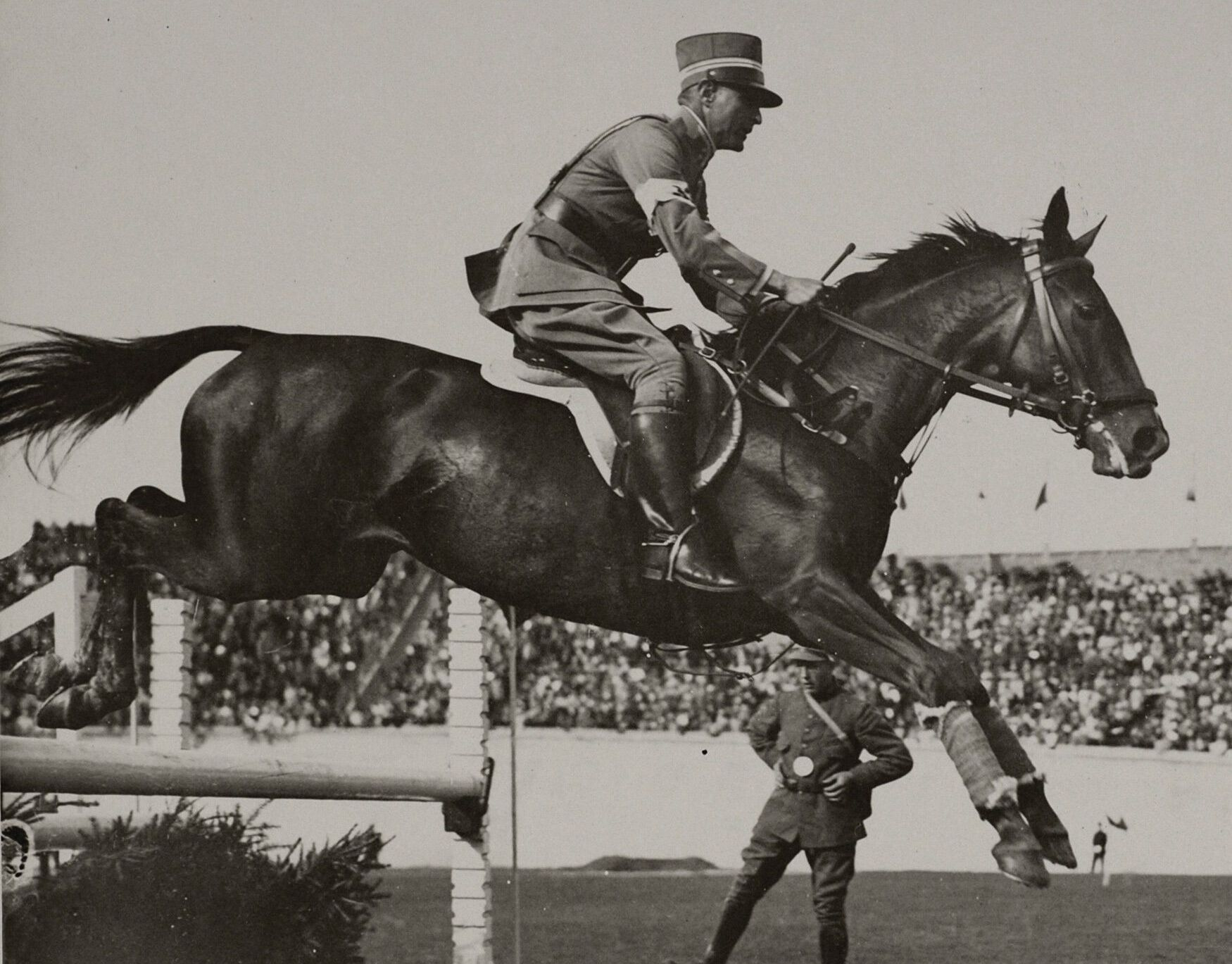

Personal information
- Nationality: Swiss
- Born: 1881
- Died: 1949 (aged 67–68)

Sport
- Sport: Equestrian

Willy Gerber (1881 – 1949) was a Swiss equestrian. He competed in two events at the 1928 Summer Olympics.
