= Józef Trenkwald =

Polish equestrian

Olympic medal record

Men's Equestrian
Bronze medal – third place	1928 Amsterdam	Team three-day event

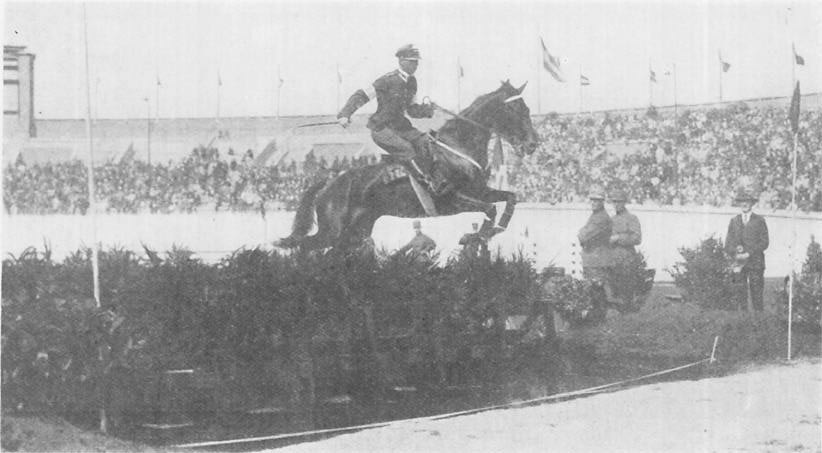
Józef Trenkwald in 1928 during Olympics in Amsterdam

Józef Piotr Trenkwald (August 14, 1897 in Vienna, Austria-Hungary – November 19, 1956 in London, Great Britain) was a Polish horse rider who competed in the 1928 Summer Olympics.

He won the bronze medal in the team three-day event with his horse Lwi Pazur after finishing 25th in the individual three-day event.
