= Josef Charous =

Czech equestrian

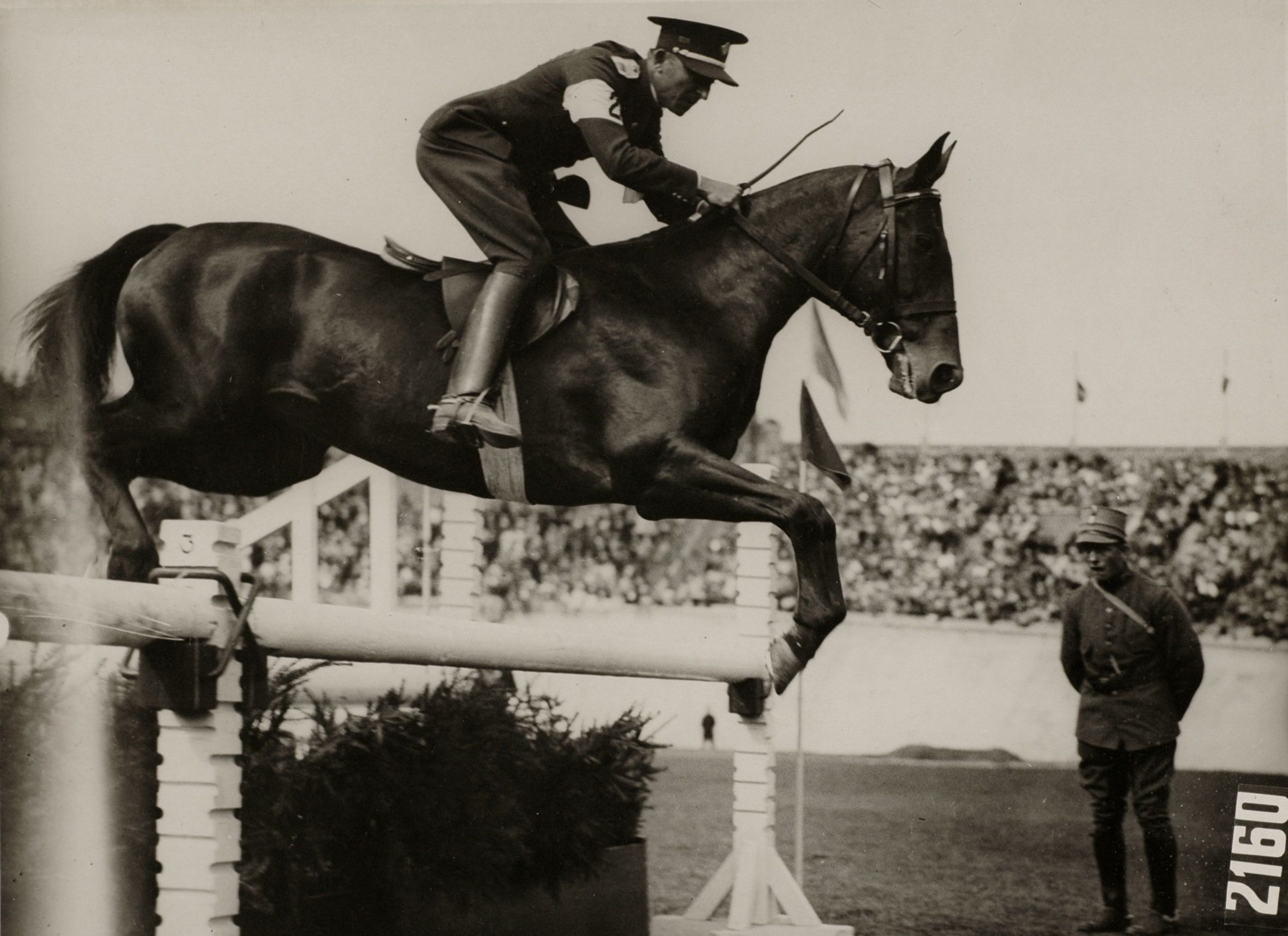
- Josef Charous in 1928

Personal information
- Nationality: Czech
- Born: 15 June 1894; Polepy, Austria-Hungary
- Died: 5 August 1943 (aged 49); Oświęcim, Poland

Sport
- Sport: Equestrian

Josef Charous (15 June 1894 – 5 August 1943) was a Czech equestrian. He competed at the 1924 Summer Olympics and the 1928 Summer Olympics. He was killed in the Auschwitz concentration camp during World War II.
