= Yunak Gymnastic Society =

Network of sports societies in Bulgaria

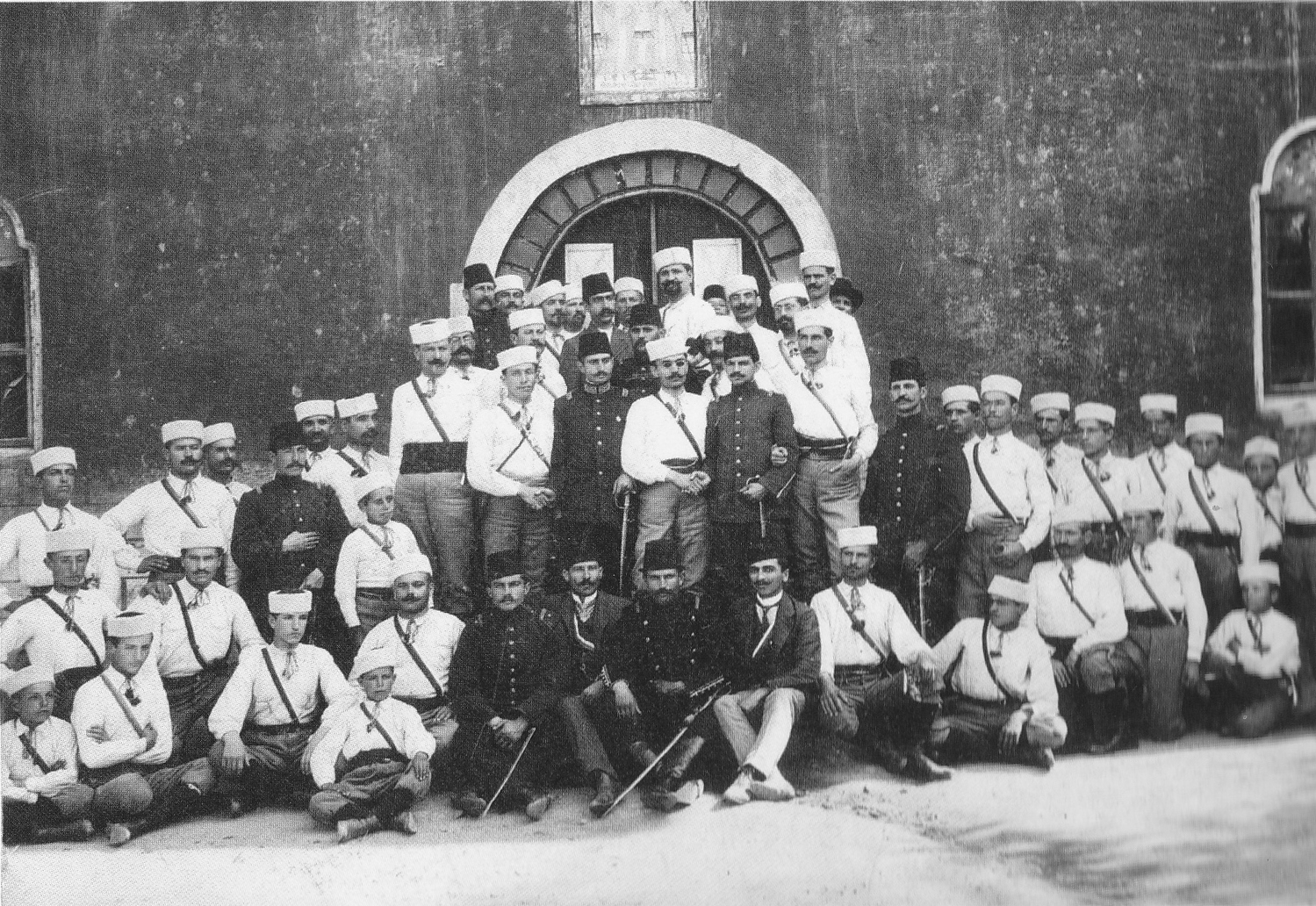
Yunak Gymnastic Society in the 20th century

Yunak (Bulgarian: Юнак) was a national network of sports societies in Bulgaria at the end of the 19th and the first half of the 20th centuries. Styled as Yunak Gymnastic Society, it was founded in Sofia in 1895. The word yunak means a strong, nearly invincible young man, and is sometimes translated as "hero" or "champion". The image of a yunak is a recurring theme in traditional Bulgarian folk tales.

The Yunak society quickly grew and, at its peak in the early 1940s, it had a membership of nearly 60 000 with 242 branches nationwide. Its headquarters were at the Yunak Stadium in central Sofia, which, during its existence (1928–52), was the largest stadium in Bulgaria and hosted many international football matches.

Yunak was an entirely amateur association, and its teams rarely participated in organized sports – although it is credited for much of Bulgaria's Olympic talent at the time. The society was made to enter a football team (which played in all-white) in the local championship after the communists came to power in 1944. This team played in the lower divisions for two seasons, before the society was disbanded by the regime in 1946.
