= Charles George (equestrian) =

American equestrian

Personal information
- Born: August 10, 1886 Fort Concho, San Angelo, Texas, United States
- Died: 30 December 1946 (aged 60) San Antonio, Texas, United States

Sport
- Sport: Equestrian

Charles George (August 10, 1886 – December 30, 1946) was an American equestrian. He competed in two events at the 1928 Summer Olympics.
