= Giuseppe Valenzano =

Italian equestrian

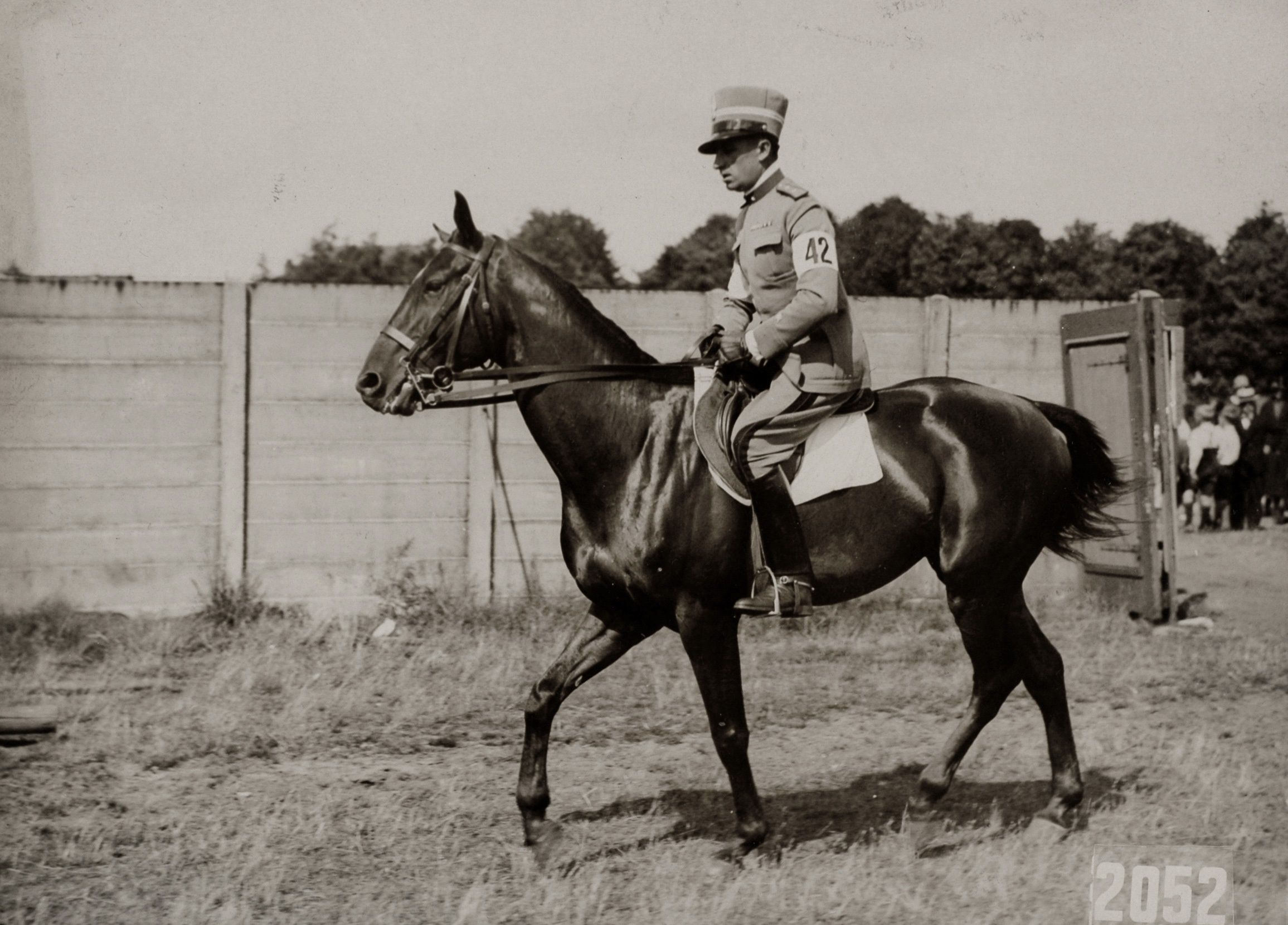

Personal information
- Nationality: Italian
- Born: 15 March 1904

Sport
- Sport: Equestrian

Giuseppe Valenzano (born 15 March 1904, date of death unknown) was an Italian equestrian. He competed in two events at the 1928 Summer Olympics.
