= Karol Rómmel =

Polish and Russian military officer

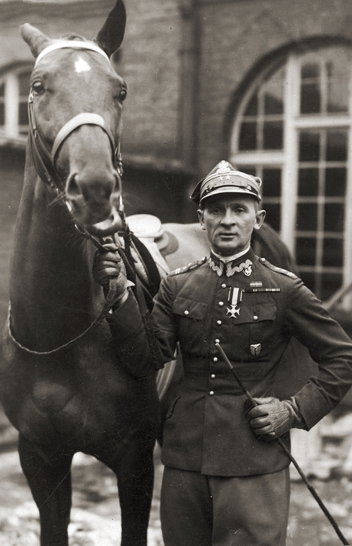

Medal record

Men's Equestrian
Bronze medal – third place	1928 Amsterdam	Team Event

Karol Rómmel (Russian: Карл Альфонсович Руммель, romanized: Karl Alfonsovich Rummel, German: Karol von Rummel; 23 May 1888 – 7 March 1967) was a Polish and Russian military officer, sportsman and horse rider. He competed in the 1912 Summer Olympics (in the Russian team), the 1924 Summer Olympics, and in the 1928 Summer Olympics (for Poland). As a military officer he served with distinction in World War I and the Polish-Bolshevist War.

== Biography ==
Karol Rómmel was born on 23 May 1888, in Grodno (then in Russian Empire, now in Belarus) to family of Karol Aleksander Rummel, a general in Russian service and commanding officer of the 26th Artillery Brigade stationed in that town. His mother was Maria née Marcinkiewicz.

Like his brothers Juliusz (who later rose to the rank of General of the Polish Army), Wilhelm, Waldemar and Jan, Karol Rómmel joined the ranks of the Imperial Russian Army. He graduated from the Odessa-based Cadet Corps and the Pavel Military School. He also received a master's degree at the Faculty of Arts of the University of Saint Petersburg. Already in his youth he started training various equestrian disciplines. His first international tournament in 1910 was a failure, but he started extensive training and already in 1912 he participated for Russia in the individual jumping competition at the 1912 Summer Olympics in Stockholm. Despite a serious injury (his fall during the final run cost him six broken ribs) he scored 178 points and finished fifteenth, 8 points behind the gold medallist Jacques Cariou of France. Immediately upon reaching the final fence Rómmel lost consciousness and had to be hospitalised. His strong will however impressed king Gustaf V of Sweden so much that he awarded Rómmel with a personal gold medal.

In 1914 he started service in the Kalisz-based 14th Little Russian Dragoon Regiment, in the rank of Captain of cavalry (rotmistr). The World War I put an end to Rómmel's sports career. He served with distinction at the Eastern Front of World War I. In 1918 together with his brother Juliusz Rómmel and a large part of their family, Karol Polonised his name from the original Rummel to Rómmel.

On 15 August 1919 he joined the newly-formed Polish Army in the rank of Major and then Lieutenant Colonel (podpułkownik). During the Polish-Bolshevist War of 1920 he commanded with distinction the 8th Uhlans Regiment. Wounded on the field of battle, he received the Golden Cross of Merit and Virtuti Militari, the highest Polish military decoration. He was withdrawn from front-line service and became a cavalry instructor at various military colleges in Przemyśl, Stara Wieś and Grudziądz.

After the armistice he remained in the army as a professional soldier. He also resumed his sporting career as the main coach of the Polish equestrian national team. He finished tenth in the individual three-day event and seventh with the Polish team in the team three-day event. He also placed tenth in the individual jumping. As a member of the Polish jumping team he finished sixth in the team jumping competition. One of his team mates was Tadeusz Komorowski, the future General of the Polish Army and commanding officer of the Home Army. In 1928 again representing Poland he won the silver medal in the team three-day event with his horse Doneuse after finishing 26th in the individual three-day event.

He also participated in numerous international games, winning World Cup three times: in 1925, 1927 (New York City and 1928 (Nice). In December 1929 he retired from the army and devoted himself solely to sports career. He won four medals at consecutive Polish Championships (gold in 1935 and 1937, silver in 1938 and bronze in 1934). In the 1927 Polish Sportspersonality of the Year he ended up second only to Halina Konopacka. Rómmel was 51 when in 1939 he set the last pre-war high jump record (198 centimetres).

During World War II Rómmel remained in the German-occupied part of Poland. Arrested during the AB Action, he was imprisoned and spent the remainder of the war in German concentration camps of Dachau and Mauthausen-Gusen. After the war he settled in Łódź, where he continued to coach younger generations of horse riders. He also served as a horsemanship consultant in various films (and had a cameo appearance in 1959 Lotna by Andrzej Wajda and 1960 The Knights of the Cross by Aleksander Ford). He died on 7 March 1967 in Elbląg, and is buried at the Gdańsk's Zaspa cemetery.

== Nationality ==
Although the Rummel family felt Polish and spoke Polish at home, they were in fact heirs to one of the oldest German families in Central Europe, tracing its roots to certain Matthias Heinrich Freiherr von Rummel, a Livonian Brother of the Sword who in 1332 owned the Getzingen castle near Jülich in Westphalia and settled in Courland to support the Teutonic Knights in their struggle against the pagan Balts. Because of Karol Rómmel's service in the Russian Army he is often referred to as Russian. Because he was born in what is now a Belarusian city of Hrodna, he is sometimes referred to as "the first Belarusian olympian".
