= Krum Lekarski =

Bulgarian equestrian

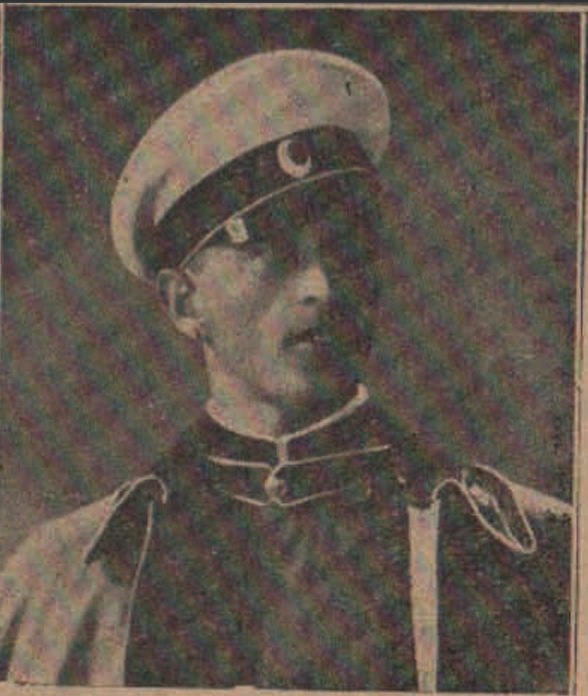

Personal information
- Nationality: Bulgarian
- Born: 5 May 1898; Kyustendil, Bulgaria
- Died: 2 March 1981 (aged 82); Sofia, Bulgaria

Sport
- Sport: Equestrian

Krum Lekarski (5 May 1898 – 2 March 1981) was a Bulgarian equestrian. He competed at the 1924, 1928, 1956 and the 1960 Summer Olympics.
