= René de Ribeaupierre =

Swiss equestrian

Personal information
- Nationality: Swiss
- Born: 1 March 1889
- Died: 2 December 1935 (aged 46); Bern, Switzerland

Sport
- Sport: Equestrian

René de Ribeaupierre (1 March 1889 – 2 December 1935) was a Swiss equestrian. He competed at the 1924 Summer Olympics and the 1928 Summer Olympics.
