= František Statečný =

Czech equestrian

Personal information
- Nationality: Czech
- Born: 10 May 1900
- Died: 24 August 1959 (aged 59); Prague, Czechoslovakia

Sport
- Sport: Equestrian

František Statečný (10 May 1900 – 24 August 1959) was a Czech equestrian. He competed at the 1924 Summer Olympics and the 1928 Summer Olympics.
