= Frank Carr (equestrian) =

American equestrian

Personal information
- Born: September 26, 1893 Savannah, Missouri, United States
- Died: September 4, 1981 (aged 87) San Carlos, California, United States

Sport
- Sport: Equestrian

Frank Carr (September 26, 1893 – September 4, 1981) was an American equestrian. He competed at the 1924 Summer Olympics and the 1928 Summer Olympics.
