= Tommaso Lequio di Assaba =

Italian equestrian (1893–1965)

Olympic medal record

Men's Equestrian
Gold medal – first place	1920 Antwerp	Individual jumping
Silver medal – second place	1924 Paris	Individual jumping
Bronze medal – third place	1924 Paris	Team eventing

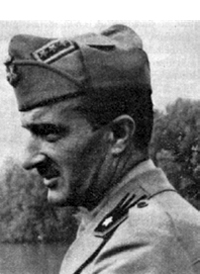
Tommaso Lequio di Assaba

Tommaso Lequio di Assaba (October 21, 1893 – December 17, 1965) was an Italian horse rider who competed in the 1920 Summer Olympics, 1924 Summer Olympics, and 1928 Summer Olympics.

== Biography ==
In 1920 he and his horse Trebecco won the gold medal in the individual jumping event. Four years later he and Trebecco won the silver medal in individual jumping. They finished fifth in the team jumping competition as part of the Italian team. He competed in the individual eventing competition with his horse Torena, but they were not able to finish. Nevertheless, they won the bronze medal as part of the Italian team in the team eventing competition.

In 1928 he was not able to finish the individual eventing competition again, this time with his horse Uroski. Therefore, the Italian team also did not finish the team eventing competition. With his horse Trebecco he finished fourth as part of the Italian team in the team jumping competition, after finishing 24th in the individual jumping event.
