= Equestrian events at the 1924 Summer Olympics =

Equestrian at the Games of the VIII Olympiad
- Venue: Auteuil Hippodrome; Stade Olympique Yves-du-Manoir
- Dates: 21–27 July 1924
- No. of events: 5
- Competitors: 97 from 17 nations

The equestrian events at the 1924 Paris Olympics included eventing (individual and team medals), show jumping (individual and team medals) and dressage (individual medals). Vaulting was not included this year. The competitions were held from 21 to 27 July 1924. 17 nations fielded teams: Austria, Belgium, Bulgaria, Czechoslovakia, Denmark, Finland, France, Great Britain, Italy, the Netherlands, Poland, Portugal, Spain, Sweden, Switzerland, USA, and Yugoslavia, with Germany not being invited. Of those 17 countries, only 5 fielded teams in all 3 disciplines: France, Sweden, Belgium, Switzerland and Czechoslovakia. A total of 97 entries and 126 horses competed. Horses in both the jumping and eventing competitions were required to carry at least 75 kilograms (165 lb).

== Disciplines ==
=== Show jumping ===
The jumping competition was held over a 1060-meter course with fences up to 1.40 meters and at a speed of 400 m/min. Civilians were allowed to compete, although many teams still had army officers. 34 of the 43 riders finished, but 17 of those had time penalties over the challenging course, which were added at a 1/4 point per second over time. 11 nations competed.

=== Dressage ===
9 nations and 24 riders total competed in the dressage competition. Unlike today, the dressage test had a time limit. For the 1924 Games, the 10.5 minute time allowed was too short and the first few riders garnered point deductions for taking too long, while those that went later cut corners and performed the test as quickly as possible. The test was performed in a 60 m x 20 m arena, as it is today, but the 5 judges all sat together on one of the short sides of the area, rather than being spread out at different points. Dressage required the horses to be ridden in a plain snaffle and split bit.

=== Eventing ===
44 riders from 13 countries competed in the eventing competition, with only 32 finishing. 8 riders were eliminated during the endurance test, 1 during the jumping test, and 3 did not contest the jumping following endurance day. The dressage test was worth 200 points total for the competition; phases A, C, and E of the endurance test were worth 200 points, steeplechase was worth 500 points, and cross-country 700 points; and the jumping test was worth 400 total points. The endurance test held a new format that would be used for several additional Olympic Games:

- Phase A: Roads and Tracks (7 km long in 29 min 10 s)
- Phase B: Steeplechase (4 km at 550 m/min, to be completed in 7 min 2 s)
- Phase C: Roads and Tracks (15 km at 240 m/min, to be completed in 1 h 2 min 30 s)
- Phase D: Cross Country (8 km course of 36 obstacles, with a max height of 1.15 meters and width of 3.5 meters, at 450 m/min, completed in 17 min 46 s)
- Phase E: Free Gallop (2 km gallop at 333 m/min, to be completed in 6 min)

== Medal summary ==
Games	Gold	Silver	Bronze
Individual dressage	Ernst Linder and Piccolomino; Sweden	Bertil Sandström and Sabel; Sweden	Xavier Lesage and Plumard; France
Individual eventing	Adolph van der Voort van Zijp and Silver Piece; Netherlands	Frode Kirkebjerg and Meteor; Denmark	Sloan Doak and Pathfinder; United States
Team eventing	Netherlands; Adolph van der Voort van Zijp and Silver Piece; Charles Pahud de Mortanges and Johnny Walker; Gerard de Kruijff and Addio; Antonius Colenbrander and King of Hearts	Sweden; Claës König and Bojar; Torsten Sylvan and Anita; Gustaf Hagelin and Varius; Carl Gustaf Lewenhaupt and Canter	Italy; Alberto Lombardi and Pimplo; Alessandro Alvisi and Capiligio; Emanuele Beraudo di Pralormo and Mount Félix; Tommaso Lequio di Assaba and Torena
Individual jumping	Alphonse Gemuseus and Lucette; Switzerland	Tommaso Lequio di Assaba and Trebecco; Italy	Adam Królikiewicz and Picador; Poland
Team jumping	Sweden; Åke Thelning and Loke; Axel Ståhle and Cecil; Åge Lundström and Anvers	Switzerland; Alphonse Gemuseus and Lucette; Werner Stuber and Girandole; Hans Bühler and Sailor Boy	Portugal; António Borges and Reginald; Hélder de Souza and Avro; José Mouzinho and Hetrugo

== Participating nations ==
A total of 97 horse riders from 17 nations competed at the Paris Games:

- Austria (2)
- Belgium (11)
- Bulgaria (2)
- Czechoslovakia (11)
- Denmark (1)
- Finland (1)
- France (12)
- Great Britain (6)
- Italy (5)
- Netherlands (5)
- Poland (6)
- Portugal (4)
- Spain (4)
- Sweden (12)
- Switzerland (9)
- United States (5)
- Yugoslavia (1)

== Medal table ==
Rank	Nation	Gold	Silver	Bronze	Total
1	Sweden	2	2	0	4
2	Netherlands	2	0	0	2
3	Switzerland	1	1	0	2
4	Italy	0	1	1	2
5	Denmark	0	1	0	1
6	France	0	0	1	1
6	Poland	0	0	1	1
6	Portugal	0	0	1	1
6	United States	0	0	1	1
Totals (9 entries)		5	5	5	15

== Officials ==
Appointment of officials was as follows:

Dressage

- (France) Gen. Detroyat (Ground Jury President)
- (Netherlands) Jhr. Karel F. Quarles van Ufford (Ground Jury Member)
- (Belgium) Baron Gaston de Trannoy (Ground Jury Member)
- (Sweden) Col. Carl von Essen (Ground Jury Member)
- (Switzerland) Col. Guillaume Favre (Ground Jury Member)

Jumping

- (Belgium) Lt. Gen. Joostens (Ground Jury President)

Eventing

- (France) Gen. Detroyat (Ground Jury President)
- (Netherlands) Jhr. Karel F. Quarles van Ufford (Ground Jury Member)
- (Belgium) Baron Gaston de Trannoy (Ground Jury Member)
- (Sweden) Col. Carl von Essen (Ground Jury Member)
- (Switzerland) Col. Guillaume Favre (Ground Jury Member)
