= France at the 1928 Summer Olympics =

- IOC code: FRA
- NOC: French Olympic Committee

in Amsterdam
- Competitors: 255 in 17 sports
- Flag bearer: Jean Thorailler
- Medals Ranked 7th: Gold 6 Silver 10 Bronze 5 Total 21

Summer Olympics appearances (overview)
- 1896; 1900; ~~1904~~; 1908; 1912; 1920; 1924; 1928; 1932; 1936; 1948; 1952; 1956; 1960; 1964; 1968; 1972; 1976; 1980; 1984; 1988; 1992; 1996; 2000; 2004; 2008; 2012; 2016; 2020; 2024; 2028

Other related appearances
- 1906 Intercalated Games

France, the previous host of the 1924 Summer Olympics in Paris, competed at the 1928 Summer Olympics in Amsterdam, Netherlands. 255 competitors, 219 men and 36 women, took part in 112 events in 17 sports. At the beginning of the games there was an incident where a French coach was physically assaulted by a Stadium gatekeeper who refused him entry. It boiled over to a point where the entire French team did not participate in the Parade of Nations, and conversations were made to pull out of the games completely. However, the issue was resolved and France went on to compete.

== Medalists ==
Medal	Name	Sport	Event	Date
Gold	Boughera El Ouafi	Athletics	Men's marathon	August 5
Gold	Roger Beaufrand	Cycling	Men's sprint	August 6
Gold	Lucien Gaudin	Fencing	Men's épée	August 7
Gold	Lucien Gaudin	Fencing	Men's foil	August 1
Gold	Donatien Bouché, Carl de la Sablière, André Derrien, Virginie Hériot, André Lesauvage, Jean Lesieur	Sailing	8 m class	August 9
Gold	Roger François	Weightlifting	Men's 75 kg	July 29
Silver	Jules Ladoumègue	Athletics	Men's 1500 m	August 2
Silver	Armand Apell	Boxing	Men's flyweight	August 11
Silver	Charles Marion	Equestrian	Individual dressage	August 11
Silver	Pierre Bertran de Balanda	Equestrian	Individual jumping	August 12
Silver	Georges Buchard	Fencing	Men's épée	August 7
Silver	Gaston Amson, René Barbier, Georges Buchard, Émile Cornic, Bernard Schmetz	Fencing	Men's team épée	August 5
Silver	Philippe Cattiau, Roger Ducret, André Gaboriaud, Lucien Gaudin, Raymond Flacher, André Labatut	Fencing	Men's team foil	July 30
Silver	Armand Marcelle, Edouard Marcelle, Henri Préaux	Rowing	Men's coxed pair	August 10
Silver	Louis Hostin	Weightlifting	Men's 82.5 kg	July 29
Silver	Charles Pacôme	Wrestling	Men's freestyle lightweight	August 1
Bronze	Claude Ménard	Athletics	Men's high jump	July 29
Bronze	France men's national water polo team: Émile Bulteel; Henri Cuvelier; Paul Dujardin; Jules Keignaert; Henri Padou; Ernest Rogez; Albert Thévenon; Achille Tribouillet; Albert Vandeplancke	Water polo		August 11
Bronze	Fernand Arnout	Weightlifting	Men's 67.5 kg	July 28
Bronze	Henri Lefèbvre	Wrestling	Men's freestyle light heavyweight	August 1
Bronze	Edmond Dame	Wrestling	Men's freestyle heavyweight	August 1

== Aquatics ==
=== Diving ===
Four divers, 3 men and 1 woman, represented France in 1928. It was the nation's third appearance in the sport. None of the French divers placed in the top 3 in their preliminary round groups to advance to the final; 3 out of the 5 opportunities, they came in 4th to just miss qualification.

Diver	Event	Semifinals			Final		
Diver	Event	Points	Score	Rank	Points	Score	Rank
Armand Billard	Men's 3 metre springboard	37	101.44	7	did not advance		
Maurice Lepage	Men's 3 metre springboard	21	132.52	4	did not advance		
Armand Billard	Men's 10 metre platform	25	67.96	5	did not advance		
Eugène Lenormand	Men's 10 metre platform	24	74.12	4	did not advance		
Renée Cretet-Flavier	Women's 10 metre platform	17.5	27.60	4	did not advance		

=== Swimming ===
13 swimmers, 7 women and 6 men, represented France in 1928. It was the nation's 6th appearance in the sport (having not competed in swimming in 1896 or 1904). The women's relay was the only swimmer or team to advance to an event final, placing 5th in a repeat of their 1924 performance. Pélégry had been a member of the 1924 relay as well. Stoffel, Klein, and Zeibig were other swimmers who had competed in 1924.

Swimmer	Event	Heat		Semifinal		Final	
Swimmer	Event	Time	Rank	Time	Rank	Time	Rank
Gustave Klein	Men's 100 m freestyle	1:05.8	3	did not advance			
Anne Dupire	Women's 100 m freestyle	Unknown	5	did not advance			
Claire Horrent	Women's 100 m freestyle	Unknown	6	did not advance			
Marguerite Ledoux	Women's 100 m freestyle	Unknown	5	did not advance			
Albert Vandeplancke	Men's 400 m freestyle	5:20.0	3 q	Unknown	6	did not advance	
Marguerite Ledoux	Women's 400 m freestyle	Unknown	4	did not advance			
Georgina Roty	Women's 400 m freestyle	Unknown	6	did not advance			
Jean Taris	Men's 1500 m freestyle	Unknown	5	did not advance			
Émile Zeibig	Men's 100 m backstroke	1:20.0	3	did not advance			
William Rozier	Men's 200 m breaststroke	Unknown	4	did not advance			
Léon Tallon	Men's 200 m breaststroke	3:05.0	3	did not advance			
Alice Stoffel	Women's 200 m breaststroke	Unknown	4	did not advance			
Anne Dupire (F)	Women's 4 × 100 metre freestyle relay	—N/a		5:42.4	3 Q	5:32.0	5
Claire Horrent (SF, F)	Women's 4 × 100 metre freestyle relay	—N/a		5:42.4	3 Q	5:32.0	5
Marguerite Ledoux (SF, F)	Women's 4 × 100 metre freestyle relay	—N/a		5:42.4	3 Q	5:32.0	5
Bienna Pélégry (SF, F)	Women's 4 × 100 metre freestyle relay	—N/a		5:42.4	3 Q	5:32.0	5
Georgina Roty (SF)	Women's 4 × 100 metre freestyle relay	—N/a		5:42.4	3 Q	5:32.0	5
Gustave Klein	Men's 4 × 200 metre freestyle relay	—N/a		10:31.4	3	did not advance	
Jean Taris	Men's 4 × 200 metre freestyle relay	—N/a		10:31.4	3	did not advance	
Philippe Tisson	Men's 4 × 200 metre freestyle relay	—N/a		10:31.4	3	did not advance	
Albert Vandeplancke	Men's 4 × 200 metre freestyle relay	—N/a		10:31.4	3	did not advance	

=== Water polo ===
France, the defending gold medalist, competed in the men's water polo tournament for the fifth time. The French squad won its first two matches before being defeated by Hungary in the semifinals. Due to misunderstanding of the Bergvall system under which the tournament was meant to be played, France then faced Great Britain, the United States, and Argentina (winning all three games). The match against Great Britain is treated as the bronze medal match here.

Summary

Key:
- FT – After full time.
- P – Match decided by penalty-shootout.

Team	Event	Round of 16	Quarterfinal	Semifinal	Final / BM	
Team	Event	Opposition Score	Opposition Score	Opposition Score	Opposition Score	Rank
France men's	Men's tournament	Spain; W 4–0	Malta; W 16–0	Hungary; L 3–5	Great Britain; W 8–1	3rd place, bronze medalist(s)

Men's tournament

Team roster

Head coach: Paul Beulque

No.	Pos.	Player	DoB	Age	Caps	Club	Tournament games	Tournament goals
		Émile Bulteel	3 August 1906	22	?	(France) EN Tourcoing	5	0
		Henri Cuvelier	1 June 1908	20	?	(France) EN Tourcoing	6	2
	GK	Paul Dujardin	10 May 1894	34	?	(France) EN Tourcoing	6	0
		Jules Keignaert	15 June 1907	21	?	(France) EN Tourcoing	3	0
		Henri Padou	15 May 1898	30	?	(France) EN Tourcoing	6	3
		Ernest Rogez	16 March 1908	20	?	(France) EN Tourcoing	1	0
		Albert Thévenon	16 September 1901	26	?	(France) Libellule	4	0
		Achille Tribouillet	25 December 1902	25	?	(France) EN Tourcoing	6	1
		Albert Vandeplancke	2 January 1911	27	?	(France) EN Tourcoing	5	0

Round of 16

4 August 1928	OR p. 810	Spain	0–4	France	Amsterdam; Referees: E. Speisegger (HUN)
4 August 1928	OR p. 810	Scoring by half: 0–2, 0–2			Amsterdam; Referees: E. Speisegger (HUN)

Quarterfinals

6 August 1928	OR p. 812	Malta	0–16	France	Amsterdam; Referees: A. Delahaye (BEL)
6 August 1928	OR p. 812	Scoring by half: 0–8, 0–8			Amsterdam; Referees: A. Delahaye (BEL)

Semifinals

7 August 1928	OR p. 813	Hungary	5–3	France	Amsterdam; Referees: A. Delahaye (BEL)
7 August 1928	OR p. 813	Scoring by half: 1–1, 4–2			Amsterdam; Referees: A. Delahaye (BEL)

Bronze medal match

11 August 1928	OR p. 814	France	8–1	Great Britain	Amsterdam; Referees: A. Delahaye (BEL)
11 August 1928	OR p. 814	Scoring by half: 4–1, 4–0			Amsterdam; Referees: A. Delahaye (BEL)

== Athletics ==
50 athletes, 41 men and 9 women, represented France in 1928. It was the nation's 7th appearance in the sport as well as the Games. The French athletics team won 3 medals, one of each color. Boughera El Ouafi won the gold medal in the men's marathon, France's first gold medal in the sport since 1920. Jules Ladoumègue took silver in the men's 1500 metres. Claude Ménard earned bronze in the men's high jump.

Track and road events

Athlete	Event	Heat		Quarterfinal		Semifinal		Final	
Athlete	Event	Result	Rank	Result	Rank	Result	Rank	Result	Rank
Gilbert Auvergne	Men's 100 metres	11.1	2 Q	Unknown	3	did not advance			
André Cerbonney	Men's 100 metres	Unknown	2 Q	Unknown	6	did not advance			
André Dufau	Men's 100 metres	Unknown	3	did not advance					
André Mourlon	Men's 100 metres	11.3	2 Q	Unknown	4	did not advance			
Georgette Gagneux	Women's 100 metres	—N/a		13.0	1 Q	Unknown	3	did not advance	
Yolande Plancke	Women's 100 metres	—N/a		Unknown	3	did not advance			
Marguerite Radideau	Women's 100 metres	—N/a		Unknown	2 Q	Unknown	6	did not advance	
Lucienne Velu	Women's 100 metres	—N/a		13.5	4	did not advance			
André Cerbonney	Men's 200 metres	22.1	1 Q	Unknown	3	did not advance			
Maurice Degrelle	Men's 200 metres	Unknown	2 Q	Unknown	4	did not advance			
Jérôme Mannaert	Men's 200 metres	Unknown	2 Q	Unknown	4	did not advance			
André Mourlon	Men's 200 metres	Unknown	2 Q	Unknown	5	did not advance			
Georges Dupont	Men's 400 metres	Unknown	2 Q	Unknown	4	did not advance			
Joseph Jackson	Men's 400 metres	50.6	2 Q	Unknown	3	did not advance			
René Féger	Men's 400 metres	51.4	1 Q	Unknown	2 Q	49.6	5	did not advance	
Georges Krotoff	Men's 400 metres	50.5	2 Q	Unknown	2 Q	Unknown	6	did not advance	
Georges Baraton	Men's 800 metres	—N/a		2:03.4	1 Q	DNS	–	did not advance	
René Féger	Men's 800 metres	—N/a		Unknown	4	did not advance			
Jean Keller	Men's 800 metres	—N/a		1:59.0	1 Q	1:56.0	3 Q	1:57.0	8
Séra Martin	Men's 800 metres	—N/a		1:58.8	1 Q	1:53.0	3 Q	1:54.6	6
Sébastienne Guyot	Women's 800 metres	—N/a				Unknown	7	did not advance	
Marcelle Neveu	Women's 800 metres	—N/a				Unknown	6	did not advance	
Jean Keller	Men's 1500 metres	—N/a				4:02.7	2 Q	Unknown	11
Jules Ladoumègue	Men's 1500 metres	—N/a				Unknown	2 Q	3:53.8	2nd place, silver medalist(s)
Séra Martin	Men's 1500 metres	—N/a				Unknown	8	did not advance	
Seghir Beddari	Men's 5000 metres	—N/a				Unknown	9	did not advance	
Lucien Duquesne	Men's 5000 metres	—N/a				Unknown	8	did not advance	
Roger Pelé	Men's 5000 metres	—N/a				Unknown	6	did not advance	
Seghir Beddari	Men's 10,000 metres	—N/a						Unknown	16
Henri Lauvaux	Men's 10,000 metres	—N/a						DNF	–
Robert Marchal	Men's 10,000 metres	—N/a						Unknown	11
Robert Marchand	Men's 110 metres hurdles	—N/a		Unknown	2 Q	Unknown	5	did not advance	
Gabriel Sempé	Men's 110 metres hurdles	—N/a		15.0	1 Q	Unknown	5	did not advance	
André Adelheim	Men's 400 metres hurdles	—N/a		59.2	4	did not advance			
Pierre Arnaudin	Men's 400 metres hurdles	—N/a		DNF	–	did not advance			
Édouard Max-Robert	Men's 400 metres hurdles	—N/a		Unknown	5	did not advance			
Roger Viel	Men's 400 metres hurdles	—N/a		56.2	1 Q	57.6	4	did not advance	
Henri Dartigues	Men's 3000 metres steeplechase	—N/a				Unknown	3 Q	9:40.0	5
Lucien Duquesne	Men's 3000 metres steeplechase	—N/a				9:58.9	2 Q	9:40.5	6
Gilbert Auvergne	Men's 4 × 100 metres relay	—N/a				41.8	1 Q	42.0	4
André Cerbonney	Men's 4 × 100 metres relay	—N/a				41.8	1 Q	42.0	4
André Dufau	Men's 4 × 100 metres relay	—N/a				41.8	1 Q	42.0	4
André Mourlon	Men's 4 × 100 metres relay	—N/a				41.8	1 Q	42.0	4
Georgette Gagneux	Women's 4 × 100 metres relay	—N/a				51.0	3 Q	49.6	4
Yolande Plancke	Women's 4 × 100 metres relay	—N/a				51.0	3 Q	49.6	4
Marguerite Radideau	Women's 4 × 100 metres relay	—N/a				51.0	3 Q	49.6	4
Lucienne Velu	Women's 4 × 100 metres relay	—N/a				51.0	3 Q	49.6	4
Georges Dupont	Men's 4 × 400 metres relay	—N/a				3:23.0	2 Q	3:19.4	6
René Féger	Men's 4 × 400 metres relay	—N/a				3:23.0	2 Q	3:19.4	6
Joseph Jackson	Men's 4 × 400 metres relay	—N/a				3:23.0	2 Q	3:19.4	6
Georges Krotoff	Men's 4 × 400 metres relay	—N/a				3:23.0	2 Q	3:19.4	6
Marcel Denis	Men's marathon	—N/a						2:51:15	28
Boughera El Ouafi	Men's marathon	—N/a						2:32:57	1st place, gold medalist(s)
Jean Gérault	Men's marathon	—N/a						2:46:08	23
Guillaume Tell	Men's marathon	—N/a						2:51:18	29

Field events

Athlete	Event	Qualification		Final	
Athlete	Event	Distance	Position	Distance	Position
Charles Alzieu	Men's long jump	6.70	27	did not advance	
Jacques Flouret	Men's long jump	6.64	28	did not advance	
André Cherrier	Men's high jump	1.83	1	1.88	7
Pierre Lewden	Men's high jump	1.83	1	1.88	7
Claude Ménard	Men's high jump	1.83	1	1.91	3rd place, bronze medalist(s)
Hélène Bons	Women's high jump	1.40	1	1.45	11
Évelyne Cloupet	Women's high jump	1.40	1	1.40	14
Lucienne Laudré	Women's high jump	1.40	1	1.45	11
Pierre Ramadier	Men's pole vault	NM	–	did not advance	
Robert Vintousky	Men's pole vault	NM	–	did not advance	
Édouard Duhour	Men's shot put	13.72	11	did not advance	
Raoul Paoli	Men's shot put	12.68	18	did not advance	
Jules Noël	Men's discus throw	40.23	22	did not advance	
Raoul Paoli	Men's discus throw	36.82	29	did not advance	
Lucienne Velu	Women's discus throw	31.29	10	did not advance	
Emmanuel Degland	Men's javelin throw	52.82	24	did not advance	

== Boxing ==
Eight boxers, all men, represented France in 1928. It was the nation's fourth appearance in the sport. France was one of 7 nations to have the maximum numbers of boxers, one per weight class. Apell won the French boxing team's only medal, a silver in the flyweight. Galataud also advanced to the semifinals, but lost there and in the bronze medal bout to finish 4th.

Boxer	Event	Round of 32	Round of 16	Quarterfinals	Semifinals	Final / Bronze match	
Boxer	Event	Opposition Result	Opposition Result	Opposition Result	Opposition Result	Opposition Result	Rank
Armand Apell	Men's flyweight	Bye	Frankie Martin (CAN); W points	Cuthbert Taylor (GBR); W points	Baddie Lebanon (RSA); W points	Antal Kocsis (HUN); L points	2nd place, silver medalist(s)
Ernest Mignard	Men's bantamweight	Bye	John Garland (GBR); L points	did not advance			9
Jean Boireau	Men's featherweight	Rolf Gustafsson (SWE); W points	Ricardt Madsen (DEN); W points	Víctor Peralta (ARG); L points	did not advance		5
Georges Carcagne	Men's lightweight	Kazys Markevičius (LTU); W points	Jorge Díaz (CHI); L points	did not advance			9
Robert Galataud	Men's welterweight	Bye	František Nekolný (TCH); W points	Johan Hellström (FIN); W points	Ted Morgan (NZL); L points	Raymond Smillie (CAN); L points	4
Robert Galataud	Men's middleweight	Bye	Michel Langlet (ARG); L points	did not advance			9
Robert Fouquet	Men's light heavyweight	—N/a	Juozas Vinča (LTU); L points	did not advance			9
Georges Gardebois	Men's heavyweight	—N/a	Bye	Michael Michaelsen (DEN); L points	did not advance		5

== Cycling ==
Eight cyclists, all men, represented France in 1928. It was the nation's seventh appearance in the sport. Roger Beaufrand won France's only cycling medal in 1928, the gold medal in the sprint.

=== Road cycling ===
Cyclist	Event	Time	Rank
André Aumerle	Men's road race	5:07:12	8
Louis Bessière	Men's road race	5:15:14	22
René Brossy	Men's road race	5:46:06	52
Octave Dayen	Men's road race	5:15:54	23
André Aumerle	Men's team road race	15:38:20	7
Louis Bessière	Men's team road race	15:38:20	7
René Brossy	Men's team road race	15:38:20	7
Octave Dayen	Men's team road race	15:38:20	7

=== Track cycling ===
Time trial

Cyclist	Event	Time	Rank
Octave Dayen	Men's time trial	1:16.0	4

Match races

Cyclist	Event	1st Round		Repechage 1		Repechage Final		Quarterfinals		Semifinals		Final / Bronze match	
Cyclist	Event	Time	Rank	Time	Rank	Time	Rank	Time	Rank	Time	Rank	Time	Rank
Roger Beaufrand	Men's sprint	Unknown	1 Q	Bye				13.4	1 Q	13.2	1 Q	13.2	1st place, gold medalist(s)
Hubert Guyard	Men's tandem	Unknown	2	—N/a						did not advance			
Henri Lemoine	Men's tandem	Unknown	2	—N/a						did not advance			
André Aumerle	Men's team pursuit	Unknown	1 Q	—N/a				Unknown	1 Q	Unknown	2	Unknown	2 (4th)
René Brossy	Men's team pursuit	Unknown	1 Q	—N/a				Unknown	1 Q	Unknown	2	Unknown	2 (4th)
Octave Dayen	Men's team pursuit	Unknown	1 Q	—N/a				Unknown	1 Q	Unknown	2	Unknown	2 (4th)
André Trantoul	Men's team pursuit	Unknown	1 Q	—N/a				Unknown	1 Q	Unknown	2	Unknown	2 (4th)

== Equestrian ==
Nine equestrians, the maximum possible, represented France in 1928. It was the nation's fifth appearance in the sport. Charles Marion (dressage) and Pierre Bertran de Balanda (jumping) won individual silver medals.

=== Dressage ===
Equestrian	Horse	Event	Final	
Equestrian	Horse	Event	Score	Rank
Pierre Danloux	Rempart	Dressage	187.10	23
Charles Marion	Linon	Dressage	231.00	2nd place, silver medalist(s)
Robert Wallon	Clough-banck	Dressage	224.08	7
Pierre Danloux	Rempart	Team dressage	642.18	4
Charles Marion	Linon	Team dressage	642.18	4
Robert Wallon	Clough-banck	Team dressage	642.18	4

=== Eventing ===
Equestrian	Horse	Event	Final	
Equestrian	Horse	Event	Score	Rank
Henri Pernot du Breuil	Titania	Eventing	1511.70	28
François Denis de Rivoyre	Nistos	Eventing	1831.32	18
E. M. Longin Spindler	Poupée	Eventing	DNF	–
Henri Pernot du Breuil	Titania	Team eventing	3343.02	9
François Denis de Rivoyre	Nistos	Team eventing	3343.02	9
E. M. Longin Spindler	Poupée	Team eventing	3343.02	9

=== Jumping ===
Equestrian	Horse	Event	Final		Re-Ride 1		Re-Ride 2	
Equestrian	Horse	Event	Score	Rank	Score	Rank	Score	Rank
Pierre Bertran de Balanda	Papillon	Jumping	0	1	0	1	2	2nd place, silver medalist(s)
Pierre Clavé	Le Trouvère	Jumping	8	26	did not advance			
Jacques Couderc de Fonlongue	Valangerville	Jumping	4	17	did not advance			
Pierre Bertran de Balanda	Papillon	Team jumping	12	5	—N/a			
Pierre Clavé	Le Trouvère	Team jumping	12	5	—N/a			
Jacques Couderc de Fonlongue	Valangerville	Team jumping	12	5	—N/a			

== Fencing ==
20 fencers, 17 men and 3 women, represented France in 1928. It was the nation's sixth appearance in the sport. French fencers won two gold medals and three silvers, the most successful nation in the sport for the second consecutive Games. Lucien Gaudin and Georges Buchard took the top two places in the men's individual épée, with Buchard also part of the silver-medal winning men's épée team. Roger Ducret, the star of 1924 with five medals, was part of that épée team for his only medal in 1928. Gaudin won another gold medal in the men's individual foil, as well as competing on the silver-medal men's foil team. The French women, just as in 1924, all failed to reach the final.

Fencer	Event	Round 1		Quarterfinals		Semifinals		Final	
Fencer	Event	Result	Rank	Result	Rank	Result	Rank	Result	Rank
Georges Buchard	Men's épée	7 wins	1 Q	6 wins	3 Q	6 wins	1 Q	7 wins	2nd place, silver medalist(s)
Lucien Gaudin	Men's épée	9 wins	1 Q	9 wins	1 Q	6 wins	1 Q	8 wins	1st place, gold medalist(s)
Armand Massard	Men's épée	6 wins	2 Q	7 wins	4 Q	4 wins	6	did not advance	
Gaston Amson	Men's team épée	2–0	1 Q	2–0	1 Q	3–0	1 Q	2–1	2nd place, silver medalist(s)
René Barbier	Men's team épée	2–0	1 Q	2–0	1 Q	3–0	1 Q	2–1	2nd place, silver medalist(s)
Georges Buchard	Men's team épée	2–0	1 Q	2–0	1 Q	3–0	1 Q	2–1	2nd place, silver medalist(s)
Émile Cornic	Men's team épée	2–0	1 Q	2–0	1 Q	3–0	1 Q	2–1	2nd place, silver medalist(s)
Bernard Schmetz	Men's team épée	2–0	1 Q	2–0	1 Q	3–0	1 Q	2–1	2nd place, silver medalist(s)
Philippe Cattiau	Men's foil	—N/a		6 wins	1 Q	4 wins	3 Q	7 wins	5
Roger Ducret	Men's foil	—N/a		7 wins	1 Q	5 wins	2 Q	3 wins	9
Lucien Gaudin	Men's foil	—N/a		5 wins	1 Q	7 wins	1 Q	9 wins	1st place, gold medalist(s)
Oda Mahaut	Women's foil	—N/a		1 win	7	did not advance			
Lucie Prost	Women's foil	—N/a		4 wins	2 Q	2 wins	7	did not advance	
Marguerite Reuche	Women's foil	—N/a		1 win	7	did not advance			
Philippe Cattiau	Men's team foil	3–0	1 Q	3–0	1 Q	1–0	1 Q	1–1–1	2nd place, silver medalist(s)
Roger Ducret	Men's team foil	3–0	1 Q	3–0	1 Q	1–0	1 Q	1–1–1	2nd place, silver medalist(s)
Raymond Flacher	Men's team foil	3–0	1 Q	3–0	1 Q	1–0	1 Q	1–1–1	2nd place, silver medalist(s)
André Gaboriaud	Men's team foil	3–0	1 Q	3–0	1 Q	1–0	1 Q	1–1–1	2nd place, silver medalist(s)
Lucien Gaudin	Men's team foil	3–0	1 Q	3–0	1 Q	1–0	1 Q	1–1–1	2nd place, silver medalist(s)
André Labatut	Men's team foil	3–0	1 Q	3–0	1 Q	1–0	1 Q	1–1–1	2nd place, silver medalist(s)
Roger Ducret	Men's sabre	—N/a		3 wins	2 Q	5 wins	4 Q	5 wins	8
Raoul Fristeau	Men's sabre	—N/a		3 wins	3 Q	3 wins	6	did not advance	
Jean Lacroix	Men's sabre	—N/a		2 wins	3 Q	3 wins	4 Q	2 wins	10
Roger Ducret	Men's team sabre	—N/a		1–0	1 Q	1–2	3	did not advance	
Raoul Fristeau	Men's team sabre	—N/a		1–0	1 Q	1–2	3	did not advance	
Jean Lacroix	Men's team sabre	—N/a		1–0	1 Q	1–2	3	did not advance	
Paul Oziol de Pignol	Men's team sabre	—N/a		1–0	1 Q	1–2	3	did not advance	
Jean Piot	Men's team sabre	—N/a		1–0	1 Q	1–2	3	did not advance	
Maurice Taillandier	Men's team sabre	—N/a		1–0	1 Q	1–2	3	did not advance	

== Football ==
Summary

Team	Event	Prelim.	Round of 16	Quarterfinals	Semifinals	Final / BM	
Team	Event	Opposition Score	Opposition Score	Opposition Score	Opposition Score	Opposition Score	Rank
France men's	Men's tournament	Bye	Italy; L 4–3	did not advance			9

Men's tournament

France competed in men's football for the fifth time in 1928. The team lost its first match against Italy, 4–3, and were eliminated from the single-elimination tournament.

Team roster

Head coach: (Scotland) Peter Farmer

No.	Pos.	Player	Date of birth (age)	Caps	Club
-	MF	Maurice Banide	19 May 1905 (aged 23)		(France) RC Strasbourg
-	FW	Charles Bardot	7 April 1904 (aged 24)		(France) AS Cannes
-	DF	Marcel Bertrand	1899		(France) Club Français
-	MF	Juste Brouzes	18 January 1894 (aged 34)		(France) Red Star
-	DF	Jacques Canthelou	29 March 1904 (aged 24)		(France) FC Rouen
-	MF	Augustin Chantrel	11 November 1906 (aged 21)		(France) Red Star
-	MF	Robert Dauphin	5 February 1905 (aged 23)		(France) Stade Français
-	FW	Jules Dewaquez	9 March 1899 (aged 29)		(France) Marseille
-	MF	Marcel Domergue	16 November 1901 (aged 26)		(France) Red Star
-	DF	Maurice Gourdon			(France) Stade Français
-	GK	Laurent Henric	20 March 1905 (aged 23)		(France) FC Sète
-	FW	Marcel Langiller	2 June 1908 (aged 19)		(France) CA Paris
-	MF	Lucien Laurent	10 December 1907 (aged 20)		(France) CA Paris
-	MF	Jacques Mairesse	27 February 1905 (aged 23)		(France) FC Sète
-	MF	Hervé Marc			(France) Stade Rennais FC
-	FW	Jules Monsallier	23 January 1907 (aged 21)		(France) Red Star Olympique
-	FW	Paul Nicolas	4 November 1899 (aged 28)		(France) Red Star
-	MF	Henri Pavillard	15 August 1905 (aged 22)		(France) Stade Français
-	GK	Alex Thépot	30 July 1906 (aged 21)		(France) FEC Levallois
-	MF	Alexandre Villaplane	12 September 1905 (aged 22)		(France) SC Nîmes
-	MF	Jacques Wild	1905		(France) Stade Français
-	DF	Urbain Wallet	4 July 1899 (aged 28)		(France) Amiens AC

Round of 16

29 May 1928
14:00

Italy	4–3	France
Rosetti 19'; Levratto 39'; Banchero 43'; Baloncieri 60'	Report	Brouzes 15', 17'; Dauphin 61'

Olympic Stadium, Amsterdam
Attendance: 2,509
Referee: Henri Christophe (BEL)

== Gymnastics ==
=== Artistic gymnastics ===
Twenty gymnasts, 8 men and 12 women, competed for France in 1928. It was the nation's seventh appearance in the sport, having not competed in gymnastics only in 1904. France was one of 5 nation's to send women to the first Olympic women's gymnastics competition. The French men's team placed 4th of 11, while the women's team finished 5th of 5. None of the individual gymnasts won any medals; it was the first time since 1896 that France had competed in gymnastics but not won any medals. André Lemoine came closest, with a fourth-place finish in the parallel bars.

Gymnast	Event	Score	Rank
André Chatelain	Men's all-around	202.375	54
Jean Gounot	Men's all-around	216.750	39
Alfred Krauss	Men's all-around	DNF	–
Jean Larrouy	Men's all-around	226.500	29
André Lemoine	Men's all-around	232.000	22
Georges Leroux	Men's all-around	235.750	17
Étienne Schmitt	Men's all-around	219.125	35
Armand Solbach	Men's all-around	241.625	11
André Chatelain	Men's team all-around	1620.750	4
Jean Gounot	Men's team all-around	1620.750	4
Alfred Krauss	Men's team all-around	1620.750	4
Jean Larrouy	Men's team all-around	1620.750	4
André Lemoine	Men's team all-around	1620.750	4
Georges Leroux	Men's team all-around	1620.750	4
Étienne Schmitt	Men's team all-around	1620.750	4
Armand Solbach	Men's team all-around	1620.750	4
Mathilde Bataille	Women's team all-around	247.50	5
Honorine Delescluse	Women's team all-around	247.50	5
Louise Delescluse	Women's team all-around	247.50	5
Galuëlle Dhont	Women's team all-around	247.50	5
Valentine Héméryck	Women's team all-around	247.50	5
Paulette Houtéer	Women's team all-around	247.50	5
Georgette Meulebroeck	Women's team all-around	247.50	5
Renée Oger	Women's team all-around	247.50	5
Antonie Straeteman	Women's team all-around	247.50	5
Jeanne Vanoverloop	Women's team all-around	247.50	5
Berthe Verstraete	Women's team all-around	247.50	5
Geneviève Vankiersbilck	Women's team all-around	247.50	5
André Chatelain	Men's horizontal bar	49.25	41
Jean Gounot	Men's horizontal bar	54.25	14
Alfred Krauss	Men's horizontal bar	DNF	–
Jean Larrouy	Men's horizontal bar	50.75	37
André Lemoine	Men's horizontal bar	54.00	16
Georges Leroux	Men's horizontal bar	53.25	25
Étienne Schmitt	Men's horizontal bar	47.50	45
Armand Solbach	Men's horizontal bar	55.50	9
André Chatelain	Men's parallel bars	42.00	55
Jean Gounot	Men's parallel bars	42.75	51
Jean Larrouy	Men's parallel bars	48.25	36
André Lemoine	Men's parallel bars	53.75	4
Georges Leroux	Men's parallel bars	52.25	15
Étienne Schmitt	Men's parallel bars	46.50	41
Armand Solbach	Men's parallel bars	53.00	12
André Chatelain	Men's pommel horse	38.00	68
Jean Gounot	Men's pommel horse	50.75	24
Alfred Krauss	Men's pommel horse	49.00	33
Jean Larrouy	Men's pommel horse	52.50	15
André Lemoine	Men's pommel horse	47.75	41
Georges Leroux	Men's pommel horse	54.75	6
Étienne Schmitt	Men's pommel horse	48.75	34
Armand Solbach	Men's pommel horse	53.00	14
André Chatelain	Men's rings	49.75	33
Jean Gounot	Men's rings	47.75	47
Alfred Krauss	Men's rings	51.25	25
Jean Larrouy	Men's rings	48.00	46
André Lemoine	Men's rings	50.75	26
Georges Leroux	Men's rings	47.50	49
Étienne Schmitt	Men's rings	48.75	41
Armand Solbach	Men's rings	54.25	8
André Chatelain	Men's vault	23.375	63
Jean Gounot	Men's vault	21.250	75
Alfred Krauss	Men's vault	DNF	–
Jean Larrouy	Men's vault	27.000	21
André Lemoine	Men's vault	25.750	37
Georges Leroux	Men's vault	28.000	6
Étienne Schmitt	Men's vault	27.625	10
Armand Solbach	Men's vault	25.875	36

== Hockey ==
Summary

Team	Event	Group Stage					Final / BM	
Team	Event	Opposition Score	Opposition Score	Opposition Score	Opposition Score	Rank	Opposition Score	Rank
France men's	Men's tournament	Netherlands; L 5–0	Spain; W 2–1	Germany; L 2–0	—N/a	3	Did not advance	5

=== Men's tournament ===
France competed in men's field hockey in 1928, the only nation to have competed in all 3 tournaments to that point. The team went 1–2 in its group, finishing 3rd in pool play and not advancing the gold or bronze medal finals.

Team roster

The following is the France roster in the men's field hockey tournament of the 1928 Summer Olympics.

- Georges Arlin
- Guy Chevalier
- Pierre de Lévaque
- Félix Grimonprez
- Marcel Lachmann
- Maurice Lanet
- Roger Petit-Didier
- Henri Peuchot
- Bernard Poussineau
- Pierre Prieur
- Jacques Rivière
- Jean Robin
- Robert Salarnier
- Jacques Simon
- Charles Six
- A. Bié
- M. L. Guirard
- Paul Imbault
- H. E. J. A. Reisenthel
- J. Rémusat

Group play

Pos	Team	Pld	W	D	L	GF	GA	GD	Pts	Qualification
1	Netherlands (H)	3	2	1	0	8	2	+6	5	Gold medal match
2	Germany	3	2	0	1	8	3	+5	4	Bronze medal match
3	France	3	1	0	2	2	8	−6	2	
4	Spain	3	0	1	2	3	8	−5	1	

Source: 1928 Official Report, p. 689
(H) Hosts

17 May 1928
15:15

Netherlands	5–0	France
Van de Rovaart 20'; Tresling 23'; Jannink 35', 37'; Van der Veen 65'	Report

Olympisch Stadion, Amsterdam
Attendance: 5,500
Umpires:
R. Liégeois (BEL)
E. de Cindric (HUN)

19 May 1928
19:00

France	2–1	Spain
Rivière 38'; Grimonprez 68'	Report	B. de Chávarri 29'

Olympisch Stadion, Amsterdam
Attendance: 500
Umpires:
C. Terrier (SUI)
C. Ch. Geyl (NED)

22 May 1928
16:30

Germany	2–0	France
Haag 10', 28'	Report

Old Stadium, Amsterdam
Attendance: 300
Umpires:
R. Liégeois (BEL)
E. de Cindric (HUN)

== Modern pentathlon ==
Three pentathletes, all men, represented France in 1928. It was the nation's fourth appearance in the sport. France was one of five nations to have competed in each edition of the Olympic modern pentathlon to that time.

Pentathlete	Event	Shooting	Swimming	Fencing	Running	Equestrian	Total	
Pentathlete	Event	Rank	Rank	Rank	Rank	Rank	Score	Rank
Paul Coche	Men's individual	23	33	7	35	21	119	29
André Crémon	Men's individual	33	35	32	24	17	141	33
Charles-Jean LeVavasseur	Men's individual	14	21	17	26	35	113	28

== Rowing ==
26 rowers, all men, represented France in 1928. It was the nation's fifth appearance in the event. Along with Italy and the United States, France was one of three nations to have a boat in each event (and the maximum number of rowers). French rowers won a single medal, the silver in the coxed pair event.

Rower	Event	Round 1		Repechage 1		Round 2		Repechage 2		Round 3		Semifinals		Final	
Rower	Event	Time	Rank	Time	Rank	Time	Rank	Time	Rank	Time	Rank	Time	Rank	Time	Rank
Vincent Saurin	Men's single sculls	8:09.2	1 Q	Bye		8:38.2	1 Q	Bye		8:11.8	2	did not advance			
Robert Guelpa	Men's coxless pair	8:31.0	2 R	9:01.8	2	did not advance									
André Pactat	Men's coxless pair	8:31.0	2 R	9:01.8	2	did not advance									
Maurice Caplain	Men's double sculls	8:03.6	1 Q	Bye		7:01.4	2 R	7:30.8	2	did not advance					
Paul Robineau	Men's double sculls	8:03.6	1 Q	Bye		7:01.4	2 R	7:30.8	2	did not advance					
Armand Marcelle	Men's coxed pair	8:41.4	2 R	8:37.2	1 Q	7:53.4	1 Q	Bye		—N/a		7:48.2	1 Q	7:48.4	2nd place, silver medalist(s)
Édouard Marcelle	Men's coxed pair	8:41.4	2 R	8:37.2	1 Q	7:53.4	1 Q	Bye		—N/a		7:48.2	1 Q	7:48.4	2nd place, silver medalist(s)
Henri Préaux (cox)	Men's coxed pair	8:41.4	2 R	8:37.2	1 Q	7:53.4	1 Q	Bye		—N/a		7:48.2	1 Q	7:48.4	2nd place, silver medalist(s)
Albert Bonzano	Men's coxless four	7:58.2	2 R	7:52.0	1 Q	DNS	–	—N/a				did not advance			
Henri Bonzano	Men's coxless four	7:58.2	2 R	7:52.0	1 Q	DNS	–	—N/a				did not advance			
Louis Devillié	Men's coxless four	7:58.2	2 R	7:52.0	1 Q	DNS	–	—N/a				did not advance			
Émile Lecuirot	Men's coxless four	7:58.2	2 R	7:52.0	1 Q	DNS	–	—N/a				did not advance			
Jean Ruffier des Aimés	Men's coxed four	7:42.0	2 R	7:48.8	1 Q	7:50.8	2	did not advance							
Léon le Cornu	Men's coxed four	7:42.0	2 R	7:48.8	1 Q	7:50.8	2	did not advance							
André Decours (cox)	Men's coxed four	7:42.0	2 R	7:48.8	1 Q	7:50.8	2	did not advance							
Henri Gatineau	Men's coxed four	7:42.0	2 R	7:48.8	1 Q	7:50.8	2	did not advance							
Georges Piot	Men's coxed four	7:42.0	2 R	7:48.8	1 Q	7:50.8	2	did not advance							
Joseph Berthet	Men's eight	6:44.8	2 R	6:50.8	2	did not advance									
Marius Berthet	Men's eight	6:44.8	2 R	6:50.8	2	did not advance									
Marius Gervasoni	Men's eight	6:44.8	2 R	6:50.8	2	did not advance									
Édouard Jeandet	Men's eight	6:44.8	2 R	6:50.8	2	did not advance									
Louis Jeandet	Men's eight	6:44.8	2 R	6:50.8	2	did not advance									
Alphonse Margailland (cox)	Men's eight	6:44.8	2 R	6:50.8	2	did not advance									
Charles Massonnat	Men's eight	6:44.8	2 R	6:50.8	2	did not advance									
François Thonin	Men's eight	6:44.8	2 R	6:50.8	2	did not advance									
Joseph Vuillard	Men's eight	6:44.8	2 R	6:50.8	2	did not advance									

== Sailing ==
13 sailors, 12 men and 1 woman, represented France in 1928. It was the nation's sixth appearance in the sport; France was the only country to have competed in each edition of the Olympic sailing contests to that point. France had the maximum of 1 boat in each event. The French boat L'Aile VI won the 8 metre class event, claiming first place in 3 of the 7 races (despite not starting one race altogether). In the 6 metre event, Cupidon Viking was unable to finish better than 4th in any of the 4 preliminary races and did not qualify for the final 3 races. Similarly, the French dinghy sailors were unable to qualify for the final series.

Dinghy

Sailor	Event	Preliminary series				Net points	Prelim rank	Final series				Results	Rank
Sailor	Event	1	2	3	4	Net points	Prelim rank	1	2	3	4	Results	Rank
Charles Laverne	12' Dinghy	10 RET	7	7 RET	6	30	16	did not advance					
Louis Pauly	12' Dinghy	10 RET	7	7 RET	6	30	16	did not advance					

6 metre and 8 metre classes

Sailor	Event	1	2	3	4	5	6	7	Results	Rank
Philippe de Rothschild (helm)	6 Metre	4th	9th	4th	11th	did not advance			2 × 4th	8
Henry Allard	6 Metre	4th	9th	4th	11th	did not advance			2 × 4th	8
Robert Gufflet	6 Metre	4th	9th	4th	11th	did not advance			2 × 4th	8
Pierre Moussié	6 Metre	4th	9th	4th	11th	did not advance			2 × 4th	8
Jean Pierre Rouanet	6 Metre	4th	9th	4th	11th	did not advance			2 × 4th	8
Donatien Bouché (helm)	8 Metre	7th	1st	DNS	2nd	4th	1st	1st	3 × 1st	1st place, gold medalist(s)
André Derrien	8 Metre	7th	1st	DNS	2nd	4th	1st	1st	3 × 1st	1st place, gold medalist(s)
Virginie Hériot	8 Metre	7th	1st	DNS	2nd	4th	1st	1st	3 × 1st	1st place, gold medalist(s)
André Lesauvage	8 Metre	7th	1st	DNS	2nd	4th	1st	1st	3 × 1st	1st place, gold medalist(s)
Jean Lesieur	8 Metre	7th	1st	DNS	2nd	4th	1st	1st	3 × 1st	1st place, gold medalist(s)
Carl de la Sablière	8 Metre	7th	1st	DNS	2nd	4th	1st	1st	3 × 1st	1st place, gold medalist(s)

== Weightlifting ==
Ten weightlifters, all men, represented France in 1928. France was one of five nations to have the maximum number of weightlifters, with two in each weight class. It was the nation's third appearance in the sport. French weightlifters won a total of three medals, one of each color. Roger François set a new world record in the combined total for the 75 kg weight class, winning the event with 335 kg. Louis Hostin, the silver medalist in the 82.5 kg class, shared new Olympic records with champion El Sayed Nosseir of Egypt in two lifts, the press and the clean & jerk. Jules Meese was one of four men to share the new Olympic record in the press for the 67.5 kg class.

Lifter	Event	Press		Snatch		Clean & Jerk		Total	
Lifter	Event	Result	Rank	Result	Rank	Result	Rank	Result	Rank
Henri Baudrand	Men's −60 kg	77.5	7	80	7	107.5	5	265	7
Henri Rivière	Men's −60 kg	70	17	85	3	107.5	5	260	10
Fernand Arnout	Men's −67.5 kg	85	6	97.5	2	120	3	302.5	3rd place, bronze medalist(s)
Jules Meese	Men's −67.5 kg	90 OR	1	87.5	7	115	7	292.5	6
Roger François	Men's −75 kg	102.5	2	102.5	2	130	2	335 WR	1st place, gold medalist(s)
Gaston le Pût	Men's −75 kg	92.5	4	95	5	125	4	312.5	5
Louis Hostin	Men's −82.5 kg	100 OR	1	110	2	142.5 OR	1	352.5	2nd place, silver medalist(s)
Pierre Vibert	Men's −82.5 kg	95	4	95	7	125	10	315	7
Marcel Dumoulin	Men's +82.5 kg	92.5	14	100	8	135	7	327.5	10
Claudius Dutriève	Men's +82.5 kg	97.5	11	100	8	132.5	9	330	9

== Wrestling ==
Thirteen wrestlers, all men, represented France in 1928. France was one of three nations (along with Belgium and Finland) to have a wrestler in each weight class. It was the nation's fourth appearance in the sport. French wrestlers won three medals, all in freestyle: one silver and two bronze. They were France's first medals in freestyle wrestling; the nation's only previous medal was in Greco-Roman.

=== Freestyle wrestling ===
Wrestler	Event	Gold medal rounds				Silver medal rounds		Bronze medal rounds		Rank
Wrestler	Event	Round of 16	Quarterfinals	Semifinals	Final	Semifinals	Final	Semifinals	Final	Rank
Wrestler	Event	Opposition Result	Opposition Result	Opposition Result	Opposition Result	Opposition Result	Opposition Result	Opposition Result	Opposition Result	Rank
Michel Rozan	Men's bantamweight	—N/a	Hewitt (USA); L	did not advance		Not qualified		Not qualified		7
René Rottenfluc	Men's featherweight	Bye	Pihlajamäki (FIN); L	did not advance		Not qualified		—N/a	Minder (FIN); L	4
Charles Pacôme	Men's lightweight	Bye	Leino (FIN); W	Käpp (EST); L	Did not advance	Nilsen (NOR); W	Jørgensen (DEN); W	Already ranked		2nd place, silver medalist(s)
Jean Jourlin	Men's welterweight	Bye	Käsermann (SUI); W	Haavisto (FIN); L	Did not advance	Appleton (USA); L	Did not advance	Morris (AUS); W	Letchford (CAN); L	4
Henri Deniel	Men's middleweight	Bye	Pekkala (FIN); L	did not advance		Not qualified		Not qualified		8
Henri Lefèbre	Men's light heavyweight	—N/a	Bögli (SUI); L	did not advance		Not qualified		—N/a	Edwards (USA); W	3rd place, bronze medalist(s)
Edmond Dame	Men's heavyweight	—N/a	Bye	Richthoff (SWE); L	Did not advance	Bye	Sihvola (FIN); L	—N/a	George (USA); W	3rd place, bronze medalist(s)

=== Greco-Roman wrestling ===
Athlete	Event	Round 1	Round 2	Round 3	Round 4	Round 5	Round 6	Round 7	Rank
Athlete	Event	Opposition Result	Opposition Result	Opposition Result	Opposition Result	Opposition Result	Opposition Result	Opposition Result	Rank
Alphonse Aria	Men's bantamweight	Kamel (EGY); W Decision 1pt	Gozzi (ITA); L Fall 4pts	Ahlfors (FIN); L Decision 7pts	did not advance			—N/a	11
Roger Mollet	Men's featherweight	Malmberg (SWE); L Fall 3pts	Toivola (FIN); L Fall 6pts	did not advance					14
Paul Parisel	Men's lightweight	Janssens (BEL); L Fall 3pts	DNS	did not advance					18
Émile Poilvé	Men's middleweight	Saenen (BEL); L Decision 3pts	Papp (HUN); L Fall 6pts	did not advance				—N/a	13
Émile Clody	Men's light heavyweight	Şefik (TUR); W Decision 1pt	Appels (BEL); L Fall 4pts	Szalay (HUN); W Decision 5pts	did not advance			—N/a	8
S. de Lanfranchi	Men's heavyweight	Donati (ITA); L Fall 3pts	Gehring (GER); L Fall 6pts	did not advance				—N/a	11
