= Paris–Évreux =

Race details
- Region: Île-de-France
- Discipline: Road
- Type: One-day race
- Organiser: VC Évreux
- Race director: Laurent Eudeline

History
- First edition: 1896
- Editions: 94
- Final edition: 2017
- First winner: Bertrand (FRA)
- Most wins: Achille Souchard (FRA) (3 wins)
- Final winner: Risto Raid (EST)

Paris–Évreux was an annual single-day road cycling race held in Île-de-France between 1896 and 2017.

== Winners ==
Year	Winner	Second	Third
1896	(France) Bertrand	(France) Perrin	
1897	(France) Marcel Doré	(France) Steines	
1898–1907	No race		
1908	(France) Fernand Bonnet	(France) A. Thomann	(France) J. Champeaux
1909	(France) Victor Philippe	(France) G. Lorrain	(France) Gaston Degy
1910	(France) Georges Perrette	(France) Honoré Barthélémy	(France) Victor Philippe
1911	No race		
1912	(France) René Vandenhove	(France) Auguste Sabatier	(France) Jean Carnet
1913	(France) René Vandenhove	(France) Charles Mantelet	(France) Pierre Vugé
1914	(France) Charles Mantelet	(France) Francis Pélissier	(France) Maurice Daum
1915	No race		
1916	(France) Louis Ippia	(France) Lucien Choury	(France) Jouanneau
1917	(France) Max Berry	(France) Fourier	(France) Hoffbourg
1918			
1919	(France) Achille Souchard		
1920	(France) Achille Souchard	(France) Georges Habert	(France) Marius Chocque
1921	(France) Robert Grassin	(France) Marcel Gobillot	(France) Gabriel Marcillac
1922	(France) Gabriel Marcillac	(France) Marcel Gobillot	(France) Roger Lacolle
1923	(France) Achille Souchard	(France) René Deguai	(France) Raymond Combescot
1924	(France) Alexis Blanc-Garin	(France) Georges Leblanc	(France) André Vugé
1925	(France) Pierre Magne	(France) André Leducq	(France) Georges Wambst
1926	(France) Armand Blanchonnet	(France) Octave Dayen	(France) René Brossy
1927	(France) André Aumerle	(France) René Brossy	(France) Raymond Beyle
1928	(France) Jules Merviel	(France) Léon Bessières	(France) F. Lefèbvre
1929	(France) Robert Rigaux	(France) Paul Chocque	(France) André Aumerle
1930	(France) Paul Chocque	(France) Aimé Trantoul	(France) Léon Le Calvez
1931	(France) Amédée Fournier	(France) René Le Grevès	(France) Robert Rigaux
1932	(France) Fernand Mithouard	(France) Étienne Parizet	(France) Raymond Horner
1933	(France) René Debenne	(France) Georges Vey	(France) Jean Goujon
1934	(France) René Debenne	(France) René Durin	(France) Louis Thiétard
1935	(Italy) Marco Cimatti	(France) Jean Goujon	(France) Gérard Virol
1936	(France) Robert Charpentier	(France) Gérard Virol	(France) Raymond Lemarié
1937	(France) Paul Couderc	(Italy) Elia Frosio	(France) Bernard Voise
1938	(Italy) Domenico Pedrali	(France) Armand Le Moal	(Italy) Luigi D'Orlando
1939	(France) Robert Dorgebray	(France) Lionel Talle	(France) Pierre Chazaud
1940	No race		
1941	(France) Georges Blum	(France) Édouard Muller	(France) Kléber Piot
1942	(France) Raoul Chapuis	(Belgium) Valère Ollivier	(France) Ange Le Strat
1943	(France) Jean Ferrand	(France) Pierre Jodet	(France) Albert Dolhats
1944	(France) Roger Rioland	(France) André Mahé	(France) Jean Baldassari
1945	(France) Émile Carrara	(France) Maurice Diot	(France) José Beyaert
1946	(France) Marcel Charpentier	(France) Jean Trochet	(France) Paul Pothée
1947	(France) Roger Queugnet	(France) Jean Baldassari	(France) Pierre Coudert
1948	(France) Alain Moineau	(France) Charles Coste	(France) Jean Le Nizerhy
1949	(France) Serge Blusson	(France) Lucien Fixot	(France) René Rouffeteau
1950	(France) Louis Viola	(France) Robert Varjano	(France) Armand Papazian
1951	(France) Stanislas Bober	(France) Henri Andrieux	(France) Roland Bezamat
1952	(France) Roland Bezamat	(France) Gilbert Saulière	(France) Jean Brevet
1953	(France) André Lemoine	(France) Jean Thaurin	(France) Marceau Coquerel
1954	(France) Pierre Brun	(France) Simon Leborgne	(France) Goria
1955	(Republic of Ireland) Seamus Elliott	(France) Ronert Andry	(France) Roger Darrigade
1956	(France) Camille Le Menn	(France) Philippe Gaudrillet	(France) Maurice Moucheraud
1957	(Portugal) José Manuel Ribeiro da Silva	(France) Reynaud	(France) Guy Claud
1958	(France) André Retrain	(France) Michel Dilloard	(France) Vincent Jaouen
1959	(France) Michel Dilloard	(France) Claude Sauvage	(France) Chiapolini
1960	(France) Anselme Cosperec	(France) Jacques Rebiffe	(France) Pierre Robin
1961	(France) Pierre Suter	(France) François Le Her	(France) Bernard Launois
1962	(France) Raymond Réaux	(France) Alain Vera	(France) Fernand Etter
1963	(France) Aimable Denhez	(France) Adriano Dal Sie	(France) Paul Lemétayer
1964	(France) Pierre Campagnaro	(France) Jean-Yves Roy	(France) L'Hostis
1965	(France) Jean-Yves Roy	(United Kingdom) Kenneth Nuttal	(France) Gérard Demondt
1966	(France) Claude Guyot	(France) Pierre Campagnaro	(France) Alain Escudier
1967	(France) Francis Ducreux	(France) Denis Van Gysel	(France) Christian Robini
1968	(France) Bernard Hulot	(France) Gérard Santi	(France) Gérard Briend
1969	(France) Daniel Ducreux	(France) Jean-Pierre Guitard	(France) Pierre Martelozzo
1970	(France) André Mollet	(France) Claude Bossard	(France) Guy Castel
1971	(France) Claude Buchon	(France) Jean Patour	(France) Étienne Bouhiron
1972	(France) Jean-Pierre Guitard	(France) Bernard Bourreau	(France) Philippe Lebas
1973	No race		
1974	(France) Bernard Vallet	(France) Jacky Barteau	(France) Gérard Naddéo
1975	(France) Rachel Dard	(France) Gérard Simonnot	(France) Serge Plaut
1976	(France) Christian Schoumaker	(France) Grégoire Ruir de Léon	(France) Jean Toso
1977	(France) Patrick Friou	(France) Dino Bertolo	(United States) Jonathan Boyer
1978	(United Kingdom) Graham Jones	(France) Sylvain Desfeux	(France) Marc Merdy
1979	(United Kingdom) Robert Millar	(France) Pierre Le Bigaut	(France) Gilles Georges
1980	(Belgium) Albert Penant	(France) Michel Duffour	(France) Loubé Blagojevic
1981	No race		
1982	(France) Stéphane Guay	(France) Yves Beau	(France) Charly Mottet
1983	(France) Yves Beau	(France) Stéphane Guay	(France) Thierry Casas
1984	(France) Philippe Bouvatier	(France) Gérard Mercadié	(France) Stéphane Guay
1985	(France) Antoine Pétrel	(France) Jean-Louis Peillon	(France) Michel Friedman
1986	(Finland) Kari Myyryläinen	(France) Vincent Thorey	(France) Bertrand Zielonka
1987	(France) Claude Carlin	(France) Mario Vérardo	(France) Bruno Bonnet
1988	(France) Didier Virvaleix	(France) André Urbanek	(France) Didier Faivre-Pierret
1989	No race		
1990	(France) Jean-Christophe Currit	(Norway) Olaf Lurvik	(France) Olivier Peyrieras
1991	(Sweden) Michael Andersson	(Norway) Trand Karlsen	(France) Pascal Deramé
1992	(France) Carlo Meneghetti	(Norway) Bo André Namtvedt	(France) Jean-François Laffilé
1993–1995	No race		
1996	(Latvia) Romāns Vainšteins	(United Kingdom) David Millar	(France) Franck Perque
1997	No race		
1998	(France) Cédric Dedoncker	(France) Sébastien Foure	(France) Mickaël Leveau
1999	(Lithuania) Artūras Trumpauskas	(France) Carlo Meneghetti	(France) Alexandre Chouffe
2000	(France) Éric Duteil	(France) Niels Brouzes	(France) Éric Leblacher
2001	(France) Mickaël Leveau	(France) Nicolas Meret	(Norway) Gabriel Rasch
2002	(France) Nicolas Méret	(France) Samuel Plouhinec	(Moldova) Alexandre Sabalin
2003	No race		
2004	(United Kingdom) Graham Briggs	(France) Frédéric Simon	(France) David Drieux
2005	No race		
2006	(France) Mickaël Leveau	(France) Jérémie Galland	(France) Vincent Cantero
2007	(France) Jérémie Galland	(France) Mathieu Drujon	(France) Renaud Pioline
2008	No race		
2009	(France) Matthieu Converset	(France) Gaylord Cumont	(France) Benoît Drujon
2010	(Poland) Tomasz Olejnik	(France) Alexandre Lemair	(France) Tony Cavet
2011–2012	No race		
2013	(France) Samuel Plouhinec	(Belgium) Jeroen Hoorne	(France) Jimmy Turgis
2014	(France) Jérémy Leveau	(France) Flavien Maurelet	(Poland) Mickael Olejnik
2015	Cancelled		
2016	Cancelled		
2017	(Estonia) Risto Raid	(France) Thomas Joly	(France) Justin Mottier
2018	Cancelled		
