= 2016 Fortuneo–Vital Concept season =

Fortuneo–Vital Concept
- 2016 season
- UCI code: FVC
- Status: UCI Professional Continental
- Manager: Emmanuel Hubert
- Main sponsor(s): Séché Environnement
- Based: France
- Bicycles: Look

Season victories
- One-day races: 2
- Stage race overall: 0
- Stage race stages: 7

The 2016 season for Fortuneo–Vital Concept began in January at the Tour de San Luis. Fortuneo–Vital Concept is a French-registered UCI Professional Continental cycling team that participated in road bicycle racing events on the UCI Continental Circuits and when selected as a wildcard to UCI ProTour events.

== Team roster ==
Rider	Date of birth
Jean-Marc Bideau (FRA)	8 April 1984 (aged 31)
Franck Bonnamour (FRA)	20 June 1995 (aged 20)
Vegard Breen (NOR)	8 February 1990 (aged 25)
Frédéric Brun (FRA)	18 August 1988 (aged 27)
Maxime Cam (FRA)	9 July 1992 (aged 23)
Anthony Delaplace (FRA)	11 September 1989 (aged 26)
Pierrick Fedrigo (FRA)	30 November 1978 (aged 37)
Brice Feillu (FRA)	26 July 1985 (aged 30)
Armindo Fonseca (FRA)	1 May 1989 (aged 26)
Arnaud Gérard (FRA)	10 June 1984 (aged 31)
Élie Gesbert (Note: Gesbert joined the team on 1 August, from Vélo Club de Loudéac.) (FRA)	1 July 1995 (aged 20)
Camille Guérin (Note: Guérin joined the team on 1 August as a stagiaire, from Vélo Club de Loudéac.) (FRA)	1 July 1995 (aged 20)
Jonathan Hivert (FRA)	23 March 1985 (aged 30)

Rider	Date of birth
Yauheni Hutarovich (BLR)	29 November 1983 (aged 32)
Benoît Jarrier (FRA)	1 February 1988 (aged 27)
Kevin Ledanois (FRA)	13 July 1993 (aged 22)
Julien Loubet (FRA)	11 June 1985 (aged 30)
Daniel McLay (GBR)	3 January 1992 (aged 23)
Justin Mottier (Note: Mottier joined the team on 1 August as a stagiaire, from Vélo Club de Loudéac.) (FRA)	14 September 1993 (aged 22)
Francis Mourey (FRA)	8 December 1980 (aged 35)
Pierre-Luc Périchon (FRA)	4 January 1987 (aged 28)
Eduardo Sepúlveda (ARG)	13 June 1991 (aged 24)
Chris Anker Sørensen (DEN)	3 September 1984 (aged 31)
Steven Tronet (FRA)	14 October 1986 (aged 29)
Florian Vachon (FRA)	2 January 1985 (aged 30)
Boris Vallée (BEL)	3 June 1993 (aged 22)

Riders who joined the team for the 2016 season

Rider	2015 team
Vegard Breen	Lotto–Soudal
Francis Mourey	FDJ
Boris Vallée	FDJ
Chris Anker Sørensen	Tinkoff–Saxo
Franck Bonnamour	neo-pro (BIC 2000)
Julien Loubet	Team Marseille 13 KTM
Steven Tronet	Auber 93

Riders who left the team during or after the 2015 season

Rider	2016 team
Florian Guillou	Retired
Christophe Laborie	Delko–Marseille Provence KTM
Matthieu Boulo	Team Raleigh–GAC
Romain Feillu	HP BTP–Auber93

== Season victories ==
Date	Race	Competition	Rider	Country	Location
21 January	Tour de San Luis, Stage 4	UCI America Tour	Eduardo Sepúlveda (ARG)	Argentina	Cerro El Amago
24 January	Tour de San Luis, Mountains classification	UCI America Tour	Eduardo Sepúlveda (ARG)	Argentina	
24 January	La Tropicale Amissa Bongo, Stage 7	UCI Africa Tour	Yauheni Hutarovich (BLR)	Gabon	Libreville
14 April	Grand Prix de Denain	UCI Europe Tour	Daniel McLay (GBR)	France	Denain
26 April	Tour de Bretagne, Stage 2	UCI Europe Tour	Boris Vallée (BEL)	France	Louisfert
29 April	Tour de Bretagne, Stage 5	UCI Europe Tour	Boris Vallée (BEL)	France	Treffléan
22 May	Grand Prix de la Somme	UCI Europe Tour	Daniel McLay (GBR)	France	Albert
5 June	Tour de Luxembourg, Mountains classification	UCI Europe Tour	Brice Feillu (FRA)	Luxembourg	
11 June	Ronde de l'Oise, Stage 3	UCI Europe Tour	Boris Vallée (BEL)	France	Laigneville
18 June	Tour des Pays de Savoie, Stage 3	UCI Europe Tour	Pierre-Luc Périchon (FRA)	France	Modane
24 July	Tour de Wallonie, Stage 2	UCI Europe Tour	Boris Vallée (BEL)	Belgium	Le Rœulx
