= Budig =

Budig is a surname. Notable people with this surname include:

- Ernst Budig (1908–1971), German swimmer
- Gene Budig (1939–2020), American baseball executive and academic administrator
- Rebecca Budig (born 1973), American actress and television presenter

== Other uses ==
- Budig Hall – An academic building on the main campus of the University of Kansas, named for Gene Budig

== See also ==
- Buding
