= Dupire =

Dupire is a surname. Notable people with the surname include:

- Anne Dupire (1902–?), French swimmer and Olympian
- Bruno Dupire (born 1958), French researcher and lecturer in quantitative finance
- Marguerite Dupire (1920–2015), French ethnologist
- Serge Dupire (born 1958), Canadian actor
