= Francesch =

Francesch is a surname. Notable people with this surname include:

- Homero Francesch (born 1947), Uruguay-born Swiss pianist
- José Francesch (1908–1964), Spanish swimmer
- Raffaele Francesch (born 1960), Italian swimmer

== See also ==
- Francesca
- Franceschi
