= Paul Ourselin =

French bicycle racer

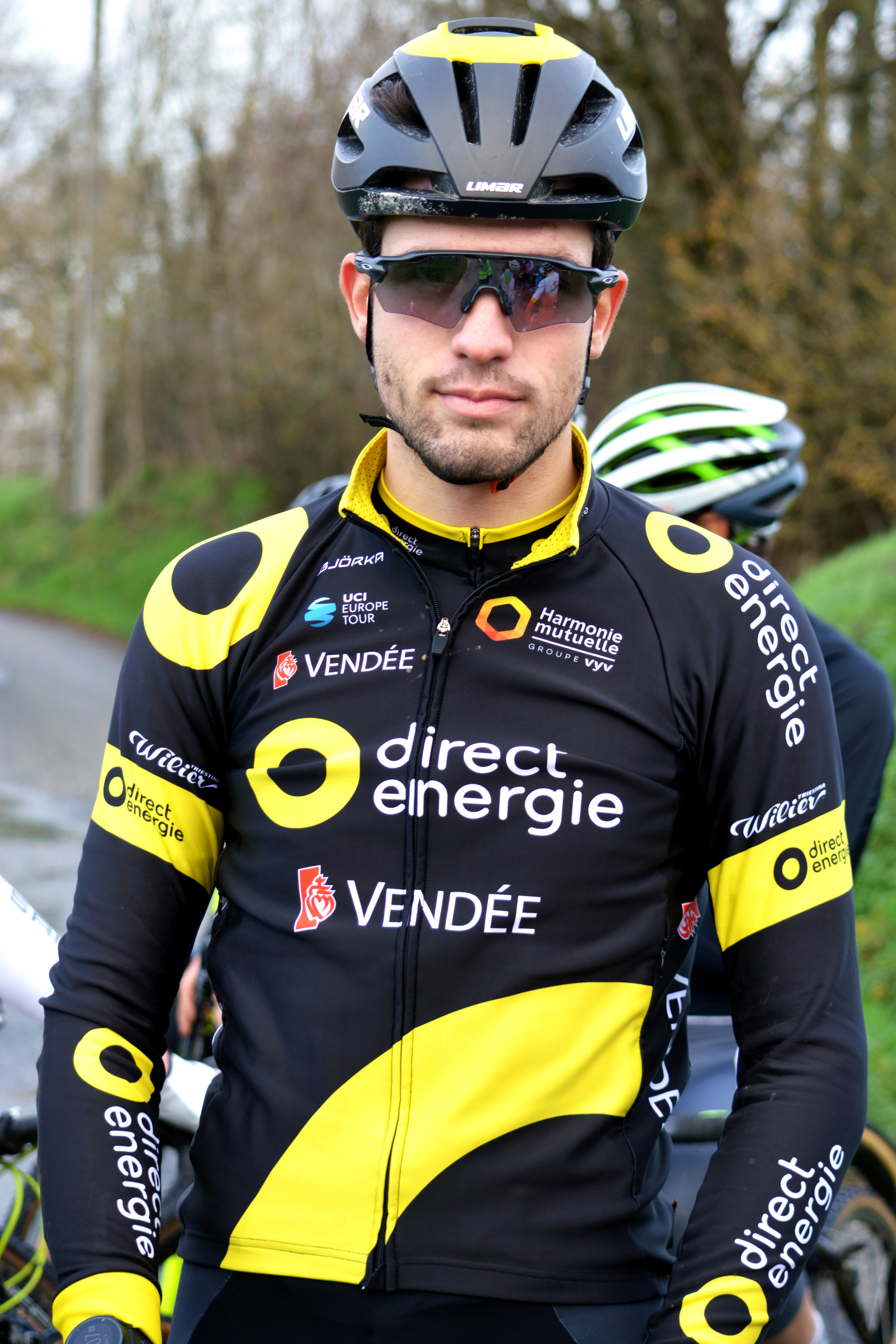
- Ourselin in 2018

Personal information
- Born: 13 April 1994 (age 32) Saint-Pierre-sur-Dives, France
- Height: 1.85 m (6 ft 1 in)
- Weight: 70 kg (154 lb)

Cycling career
- Sport: Cycling
- Current team: Cofidis
- Discipline: Road
- Role: Rider

Amateur teams
- 2012: ES Livarot
- 2013: POC Côte de Lumière
- 2014: Sojasun Espoir ACNC
- 2015–2016: Vendée U

Professional teams
- 2016: Direct Énergie (stagiaire)
- 2017–2024: Direct Énergie
- 2025–: Cofidis

Paul Ourselin (born 13 April 1994) is a French cyclist, who currently rides for UCI WorldTeam Cofidis.

== Biography ==
Born in Saint-Pierre-sur-Dives, Ourselin started cycling at the age of seven, in the French "Poussin" category, which is reserved for youths between the ages of 7 and 8 years old. Later on, he moved to Caen before leaving Normandy for Vendée, having obtained his high school diploma in 2012. He continued his studies with a 2-year diploma in sales application. During this time, he shared an apartment with Justin Mottier, while also getting to know Pierre-Henri Lecuisinier and Lorrenzo Manzin, who became racing cyclists for the FDJ team.

In July 2019, he was named in the startlist for the 2019 Tour de France. In October 2020, he was named in the startlist for the 2020 Vuelta a España.

== Major results ==
2013
3rd Grand Prix cycliste de Machecou
2015
1st Overall Circuit du Mené
2016
1st Road race, National Under–23 Road Championships
1st Paris–Mantes-en-Yvelines
2018
5th Route Adélie de Vitré
2019
7th Polynormande
8th Paris-Troyes
2022
4th Boucles de l'Aulne
2023
6th Overall La Tropicale Amissa Bongo

=== Grand Tour general classification results timeline ===
Grand Tour	2019	2020	2021	2022	2023
Giro d'Italia	—	—	—	—	—
Tour de France	95	—	—	—	—
Vuelta a España	—	79	—	—	26

Legend
—	Did not compete
DNF	Did not finish
