= Swimming at the 1928 Summer Olympics – Men's 200 metre breaststroke =

Men's 200 metre breaststroke at the Games of the IX Olympiad
- Venue: Olympic Sports Park Swim Stadium
- Date: 6 August 1928 (heats); 7 August 1928 (semifinals); 8 August 1928 (final)
- Competitors: 21 from 13 nations
- Winning time: 2:48:8 OR

Medalists
1st place, gold medalist(s)		Yoshiyuki Tsuruta	Japan
2nd place, silver medalist(s)		Erich Rademacher	Germany
3rd place, bronze medalist(s)		Teófilo Yldefonso	Philippines

The men's 200 metre breaststroke was a swimming event held as part of the swimming at the 1928 Summer Olympics programme. It was the fifth appearance of the event, which was established in 1908. The competition was held from Monday to Wednesday, 6 to 8 August 1928.

Twenty-one swimmers from 13 nations competed.

Coming into the event, Erich Rademacher from Germany was heavy favorite, as he had held the world record for several years despite not being able to compete at the 1920 and 1924 Olympics due to Germany's role in WWI. However, Yoshiyuki Tsuruta pulled off an upset by beating Rademacher with a new technique of staying underwater for most of the race, which was allowed in the rules at the time.

Despite this, Rademacher's disappointment was short lived, as he later won gold as the goalkeeper for the German water polo team in the men's water polo.

== Records ==
These were the standing world and Olympic records (in minutes) prior to the 1928 Summer Olympics.

World record	2:48.0	(Germany) Erich Rademacher	Brussels (BEL)	11 March 1927
Olympic record	2:56.0	(United States) Robert Skelton	Paris (FRA)	15 July 1924

In the third heat Erich Rademacher set a new Olympic record with 2:52.0 minutes. In the fourth heat Yoshiyuki Tsuruta bettered the record to 2:50.0 minutes. Tsuruta improved the record in the semi-finals with 2:49.2 minutes and in the final with 2:48.8 minutes.

== Results ==
=== Heats ===
Monday 6 August 1928: The fastest two in each heat and the fastest third-placed from across the heats advanced.

==== Heat 1 ====
Rank	Swimmer	Nation	Time	Notes
1	Walter Spence	Canada	2:56.6	Q
2	Erwin Sietas	Germany	2:57.4	Q
3	Louis Van Parijs	Belgium	3:00.0	
4	William Rozier	France	Unknown	
5	Hugh Smith	Great Britain	Unknown	

==== Heat 2 ====
Rank	Swimmer	Nation	Time	Notes
1	Erik Harling	Sweden	2:56.4	Q
2	Karl Schäfer	Austria	2:56.6	Q
3	Teófilo Yldefonso	Philippines	2:57.4	q
4	Yuki Mawatari	Japan	2:58.2	
5	Ernst Budig	Germany	2:58.6	

==== Heat 3 ====
Rank	Swimmer	Nation	Time	Notes
1	Erich Rademacher	Germany	2:52.0	Q, OR
2	Thomas Blankenburg	United States	3:04.2	Q
3	Léon Tallon	France	3:05.0	
4	Jack Aubin	Canada	Unknown	
—	Joseph De Combe	Belgium	DNF	

==== Heat 4 ====
Rank	Swimmer	Nation	Time	Notes
1	Yoshiyuki Tsuruta	Japan	2:50.0	Q, OR
2	Robert Wyss	Switzerland	3:02.6	Q
3	Leen Korpershoek	Netherlands	3:04.0	
4	Reginald Flint	Great Britain	Unknown	
5	José Francesch	Spain	Unknown	
6	Tage Wissnell	Sweden	Unknown	

=== Semifinals ===
Tuesday 7 August 1928: The fastest three in each semi-final advanced.

==== Semifinal 1 ====
Rank	Swimmer	Nation	Time	Notes
1	Yoshiyuki Tsuruta	Japan	2:49.2	Q, OR
2	Walter Spence	Canada	2:53.0	Q
3	Teófilo Yldefonso	Philippines	2:53.2	Q
4	Robert Wyss	Switzerland	Unknown	
5	Thomas Blankenburg	United States	Unknown	

==== Semifinal 2 ====
Rank	Swimmer	Nation	Time	Notes
1	Erich Rademacher	Germany	2:56.6	Q
2	Erik Harling	Sweden	2:57.2	Q
3	Erwin Sietas	Germany	2:57.8	Q
4	Karl Schäfer	Austria	Unknown	

=== Final ===
Wednesday 8 August 1928:

Rank	Swimmer	Nation	Time	Notes
1st place, gold medalist(s)	Yoshiyuki Tsuruta	Japan	2:48.8	OR
2nd place, silver medalist(s)	Erich Rademacher	Germany	2:50.6	
3rd place, bronze medalist(s)	Teófilo Yldefonso	Philippines	2:56.4	
4	Erwin Sietas	Germany	2:56.6	
5	Erik Harling	Sweden	2:56.8	
6	Walter Spence	Canada	2:57.2	
