= Hugh Smith (swimmer) =

British swimmer

Personal information
- Born: 16 October 1910 Renfrew, Scotland
- Died: 7 May 1963 (aged 52) Glasgow, Scotland

Sport
- Sport: Swimming

Hugh Smith (16 October 1910 – 7 May 1963) was a British swimmer. He competed in the men's 200 metre breaststroke event at the 1928 Summer Olympics.
