= Yuki Mawatari =

Japanese swimmer

Personal information
- Born: 1909

Sport
- Sport: Swimming

Yuki Mawatari (馬渡 勇喜, Mawatari Yūki; born 1909, date of death unknown) was a Japanese swimmer. He competed in the men's 200 metre breaststroke event at the 1928 Summer Olympics.
