= Tom Blankenburg =

American swimmer

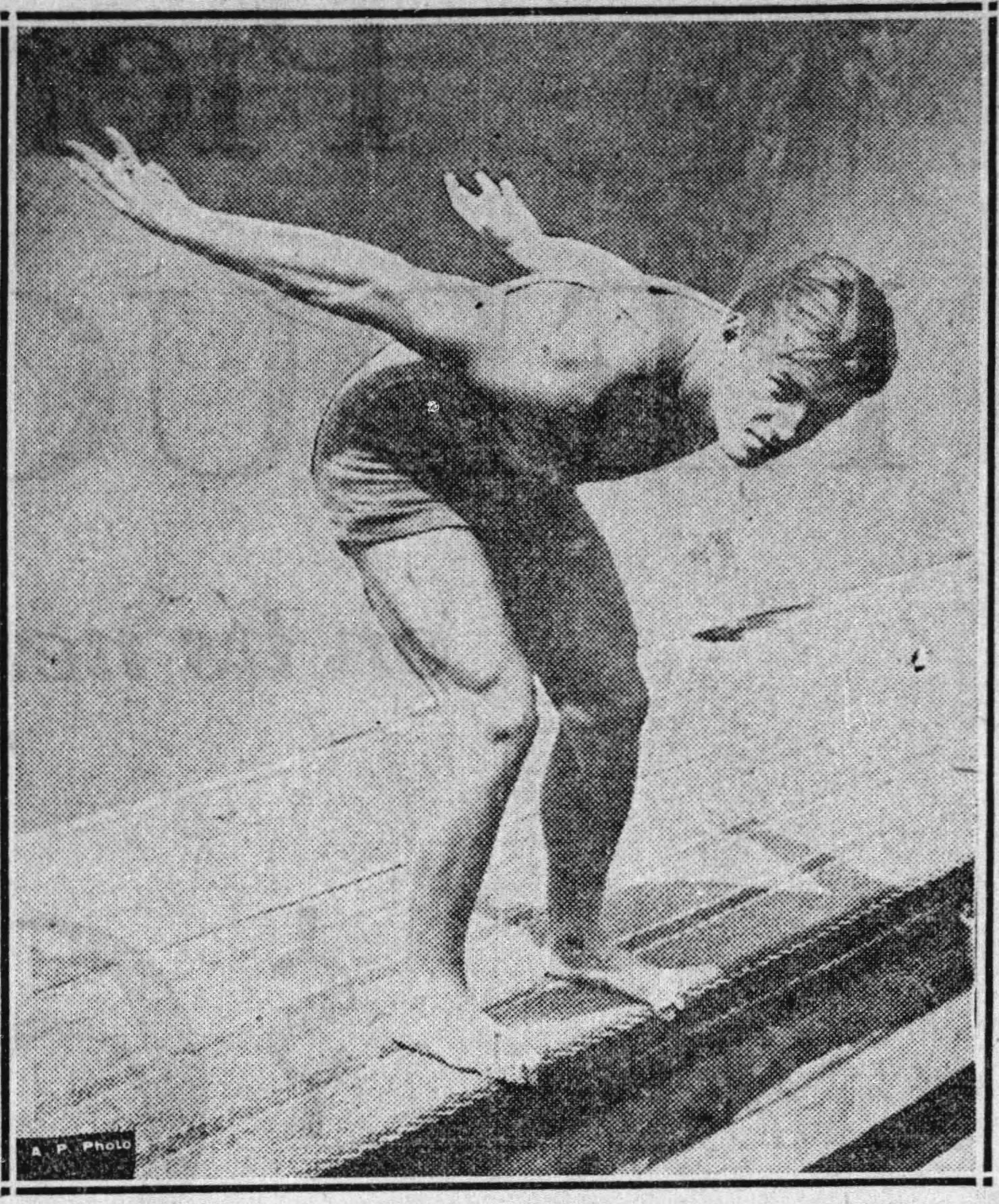
- Blankenburg in 1928

Personal information
- Full name: Thomas Jean William Blankenburg
- Nickname: "Tom"
- National team: United States
- Born: September 2, 1909 Spokane, Washington, U.S.
- Died: March 29, 1979 (aged 69) Los Angeles, California, U.S.
- Education: Lewis and Clark High School; University of Oregon

Sport
- Sport: Swimming
- Strokes: Breaststroke
- Club: Athens Athletic Club (Oakland, CA); Hollywood Athletic Club
- Coach: Clyde Swendsen (Hollywood Athletic); Bill Bachrach (28 Olympics)

Thomas Jean William Blankenburg (September 2, 1909 – March 29, 1979) was an American competition swimmer who competed for the Athens Athletic Club in Oakland, California and represented the United States in the 200 meter breaststroke as an 18-year-old at the 1928 Summer Olympics in Amsterdam, the Netherlands where he placed ninth.

== Early life, High School ==
Thomas J. W. "Tom" Blankenburg, often spelled Blankenberg in newspaper articles, and appearing in death records as Von Blankenburg, was born September 2, 1909 to Mr. and Mrs. Thomas Blankenberg in Spokane, Washington. He swam for the Spokane Amateur Athletic Club under Coach Lloyd Williams, where he participated in a swimming exhibition and competition for the National Swimming meet in Seattle in July 1925. Thomas Blankenberg Senior was an engineer, and was nominated for Vice-President and Treasurer of Spokane's Steam Engineers Union for the 1921-22 season. Thomas Sr. was a competent swimmer had completed San Francisco's 3-mile Golden Gate swim.

Following his father's example, in September, 1927, Thomas Jr. became the youngest swimmer to finish the Golden Gate Swim in San Francisco, generally a three-mile open water swim in the cold Pacific waters of the Golden Gate Strait from Fort Point to the Marin Headlands. Known more widely for short breaststroke events, Thomas Jr. held the Spokane city-wide record in the 100-meter breaststroke of 1:14.6. By 1927, he held the 220 breaststroke championship title for the AAU Far West Association. In competition, he swam and trained with Oakland's Athens Athletic Club. In November, 1927, he tried out for the U.S. Olympic team at try-outs in Chicago.

Thomas Junior attended and swam for Lewis and Clark High School from around 1924-1927. Spokane's Lewis and Clark High School principal Henry M. Hart awarded him a varsity letter and a silver athletic trophy on June 14, 1927 for setting the school record in the 100-yard breaststroke.

== 1928 Amsterdam Olympics ==
On June 8, 1928, Blankenburg advanced to the semifinals of the men's 200-meter breaststroke event in Amsterdam, under Head Olympic Bill Bachrach, and placed ninth overall in the final standings with a time of 3:04.20.

On April 3, 1930, representing the Hollywood Athletic Club, at the National 1930 AAU Indoor Championships at Chicago's Lake Shore Athletic Club pool, he won the 220-yard breaststroke event. For several of his years with the Hollywood Athletic Club, Blankenburg was coached by Clyde Swendsen.

== 1932 Los Angeles Olympics ==
He qualified to become a member of the U.S. Olympic swimming team for the 1932 Summer Olympics in the 200-meter breaststroke in mid-July at the Coney Island Park Pool in Cincinnati, Ohio, but was later disqualified as a "professional" when it was disclosed that he had worked as lifeguard in California. He tied for first place with Tom Moles in the Olympic trial 200-meter breaststroke event with a 2:55.4.

Blankenburg later attended the University of Oregon.

He died March 19, 1979 at the age of 69 in Los Angeles, California.

== See also ==
- List of University of Oregon alumni
