= Leen Korpershoek =

Dutch swimmer (1904–1989)

Personal information
- Born: 29 January 1904 Rotterdam, Netherlands
- Died: 24 July 1989 (aged 85) Epe, Netherlands

Sport
- Sport: Swimming

Leen Korpershoek (29 January 1904 – 24 July 1989) was a Dutch swimmer. He competed in the men's 200 metre breaststroke event at the 1928 Summer Olympics.
