= Jules Keignaert =

French water polo player (1907–1994)

Personal information
- Born: June 15, 1907 Tourcoing, France
- Died: May 26, 1994 (aged 86)

Sport
- Sport: Water polo
Medal record
Representing France
Olympic Games
Bronze medal – third place	1928 Amsterdam	Team competition

Jules Keignaert (June 15, 1907 – May 26, 1994) was a French water polo player, who competed at the 1928 Summer Olympics.

He was part of the French team which won the bronze medal. He played three matches.

== See also ==
- List of Olympic medalists in water polo (men)
