= Henri Cuvelier =

French water polo player (1908–1937)

Personal information
- Born: 1 June 1908 Tourcoing, France
- Died: 25 January 1937 (aged 28) Roubaix, France

Sport
- Sport: Water polo
Medal record
Representing France
Olympic Games
Bronze medal – third place	1928 Amsterdam	Team competition

Henri Cuvelier (1 June 1908 – 25 January 1937) was a French water polo player who competed in the 1928 Summer Olympics.

== See also ==
- List of Olympic medalists in water polo (men)
