= Émile Bulteel =

French water polo player (1906–1978)

Personal information
- Born: August 3, 1906 Tourcoing, France
- Died: March 21, 1978 (aged 71) Tourcoing, France

Sport
- Sport: Water polo
Medal record
Representing France
Olympic Games
Bronze medal – third place	1928 Amsterdam	Team competition

Émile J. Bulteel (3 August 1906 – 21 March 1978) was a French water polo player who competed in the 1928 Summer Olympics.

He played in five matches, and the French team went on to win the bronze medal.

== See also ==
- List of Olympic medalists in water polo (men)
