= William Rozier =

French swimmer

Personal information
- Full name: William Rozier
- Nationality: French
- Born: 1908
- Died: 15 January 1983 (aged 74–75)

Sport
- Sport: Swimming

William Rozier (1908 – 15 January 1983) was a French swimmer. He competed in the men's 200 metre breaststroke event at the 1928 Summer Olympics.
