= Jules Meese =

French weightlifter

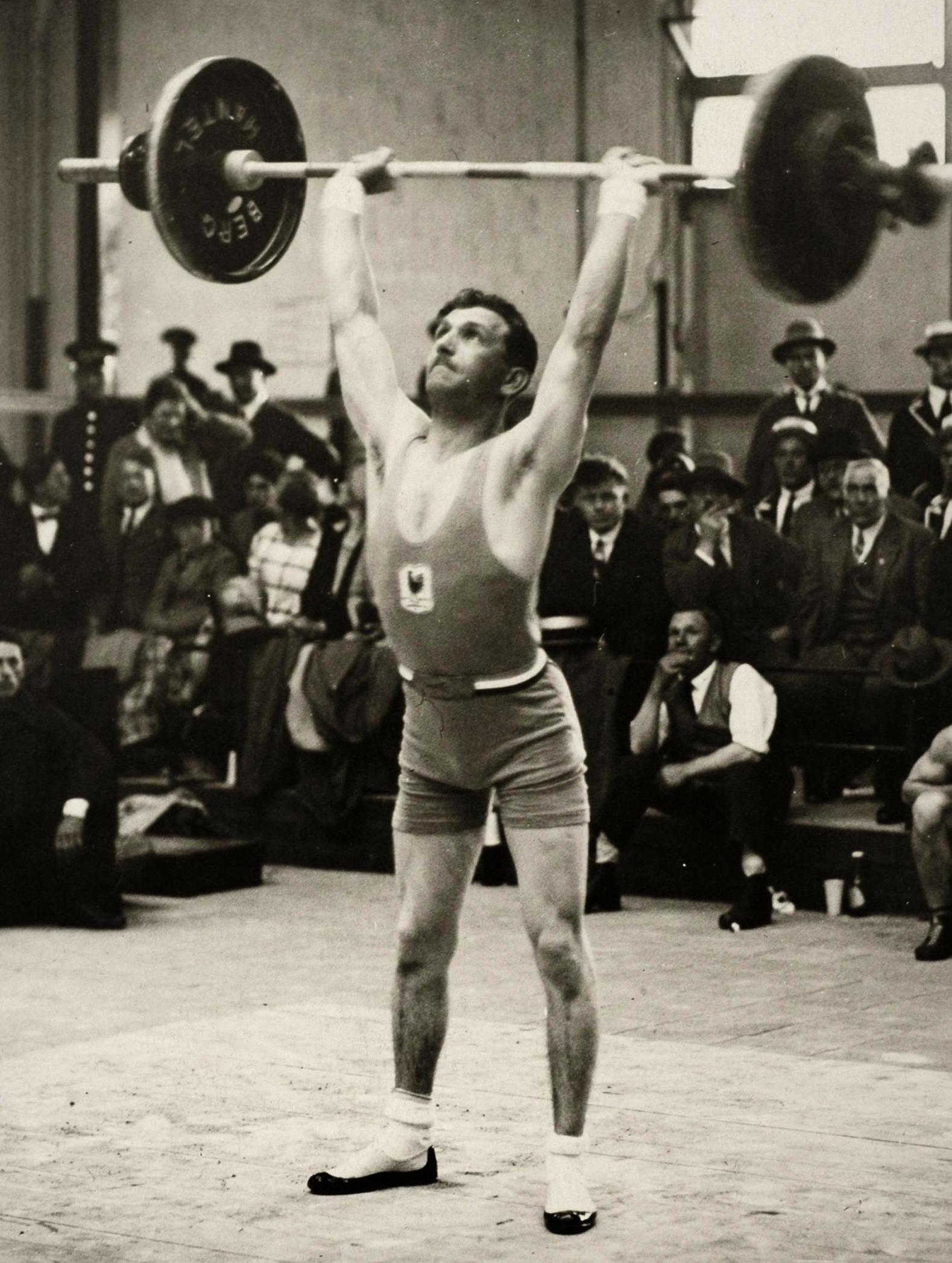
- Jules Meese at the 1928 Olympics

Personal information
- Born: 3 September 1896
- Died: 1 December 1968 (aged 72)

Sport
- Country: France
- Sport: Weightlifting

Jules Meese (3 September 1896 – 1 December 1968) was a French lightweight weightlifter. In 1925 he set a world record in the press at 92.5 kg. He competed at the 1928 Summer Olympics and finished in sixth place.
