= Gaston le Pût =

French weightlifter

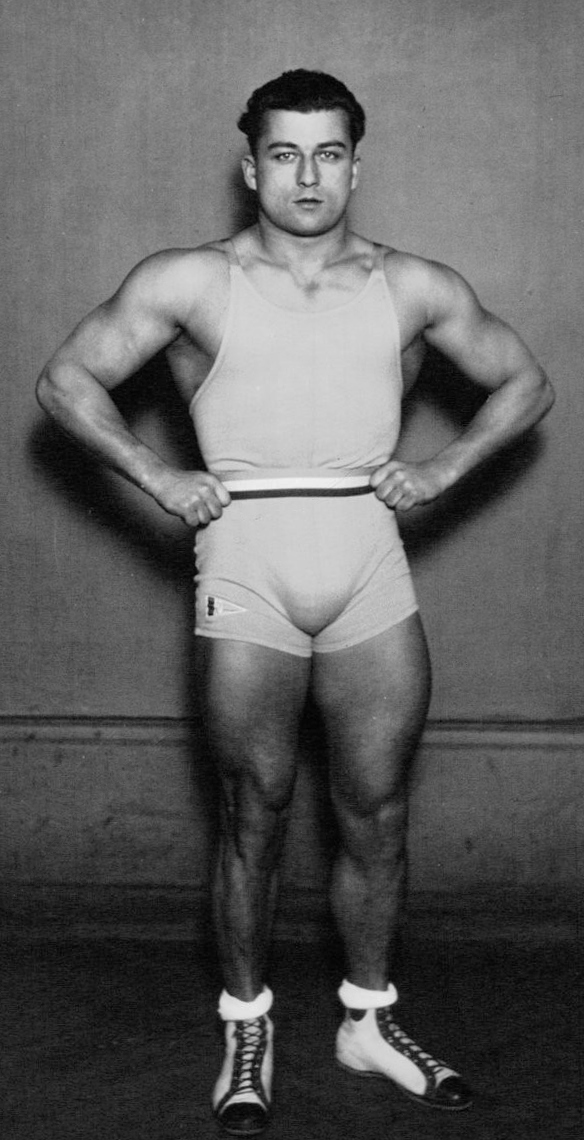
- Gaston le Pût in 1933

Personal information
- Born: 15 December 1903
- Died: 29 March 1972 (aged 68)

Sport
- Sport: Weightlifting
- Club: SA Montmartroise, Paris

Gaston le Pût (15 December 1903 – 29 March 1972) was a French weightlifter. He finished fifth as a middleweight (−75 kg) at the 1928 Summer Olympics and 11th as a light-heavyweight (−82.5 kg) at the 1936 Summer Olympics.
