= Pierre Danloux =

French equestrian

Personal information
- Nationality: French
- Born: 28 May 1878 Compiègne, France
- Died: December 1943 (aged 65) Forêt d'Écouves, Orne, France

Sport
- Sport: Equestrian

Pierre Danloux (28 May 1878 – December 1943) was a French equestrian. He competed in two events at the 1928 Summer Olympics. a
