= Albert Thévenon =

French water polo player (1901–1959)

Personal information
- Born: 16 September 1901 Lyon
- Died: 10 May 1959 (aged 57) Paris
Medal record
Men's water polo
Representing France
Olympic Games
| Bronze medal – third place | 1928 Amsterdam | Team competition |

Albert Thévenon (16 September 1901 – 10 May 1959) was a French water polo player who competed at the 1928 Summer Olympics.

He was part of the French team which won the bronze medal. He played four matches.

== See also ==
- List of Olympic medalists in water polo (men)
