= Achille Tribouillet =

French water polo player (1902–1968)

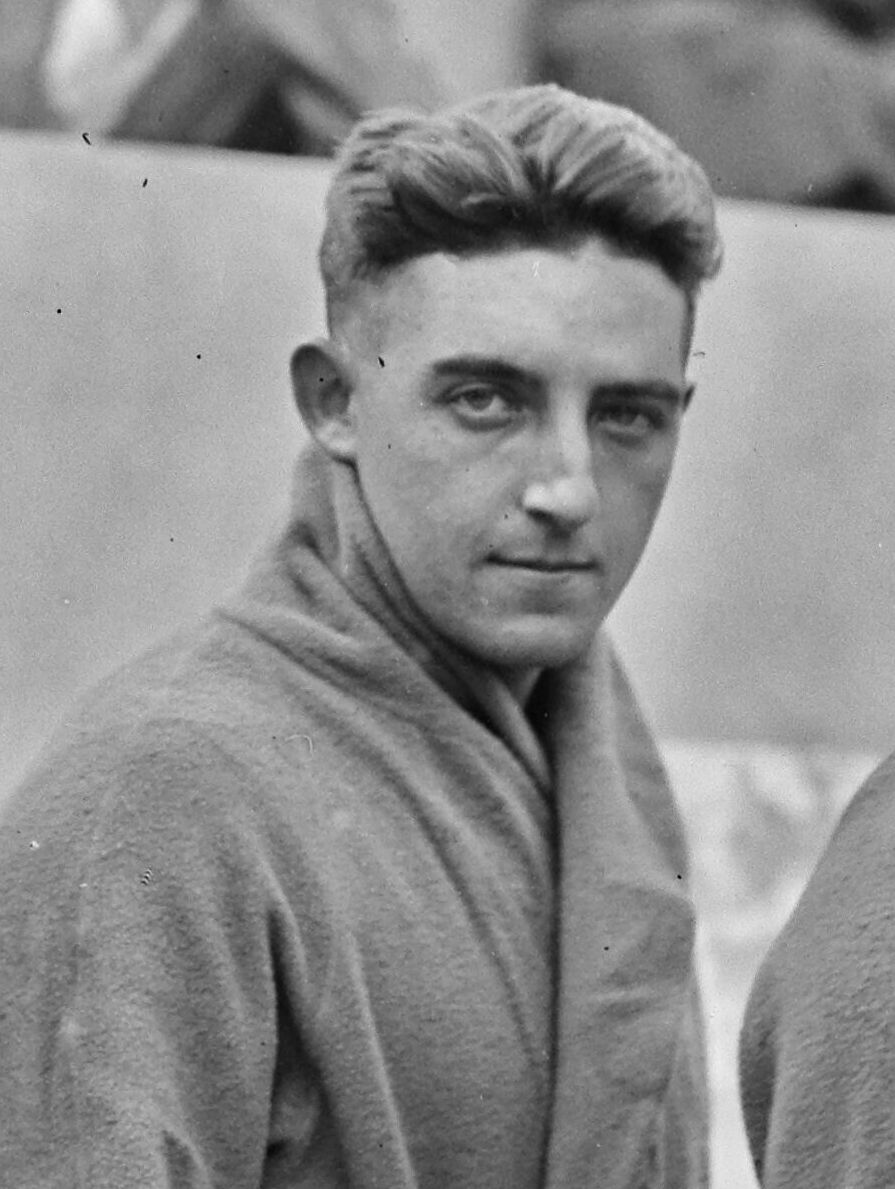
- vAchille Tribouillet in 1925

Personal information
- Born: 25 December 1902
- Died: 1968 (aged 65–66)
Medal record
Men's Water polo
Representing France
Olympic Games
Bronze medal – third place	1928 Amsterdam	Team competition

Achille Tribouillet (25 December 1902 – 1968) was a French water polo player who competed in the 1928 Summer Olympics. He was born in Tourcoing, a city in northern France on the Belgian border.

== See also ==
- List of Olympic medalists in water polo (men)
