= Armand Billard =

French diver

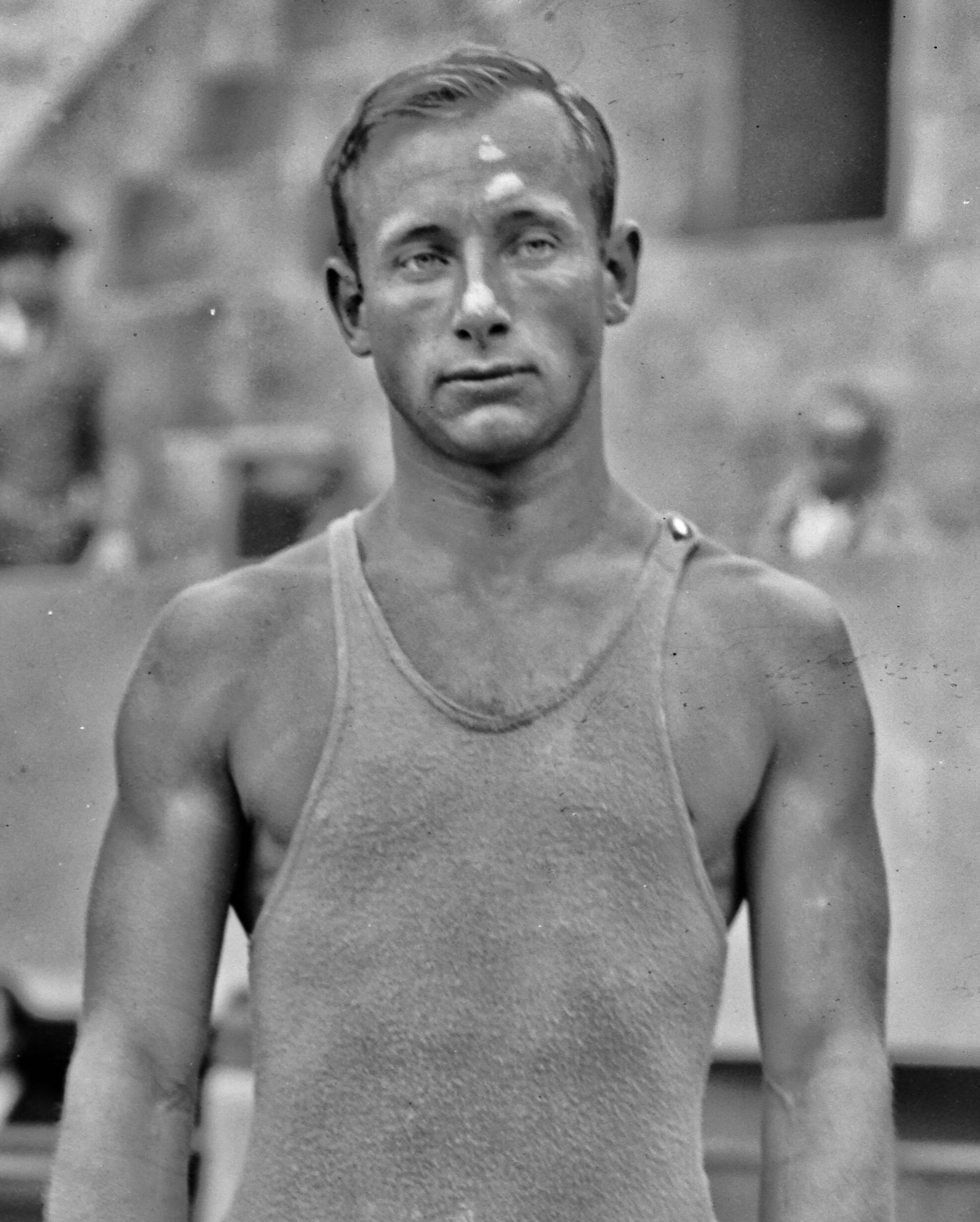
- Armand Billard in 1931

Personal information
- Nationality: French

Sport
- Sport: Diving

Armand Billard was a French diver. He competed in two events at the 1928 Summer Olympics.
