= Albert Vandeplancke =

French water polo player (1911–1939)

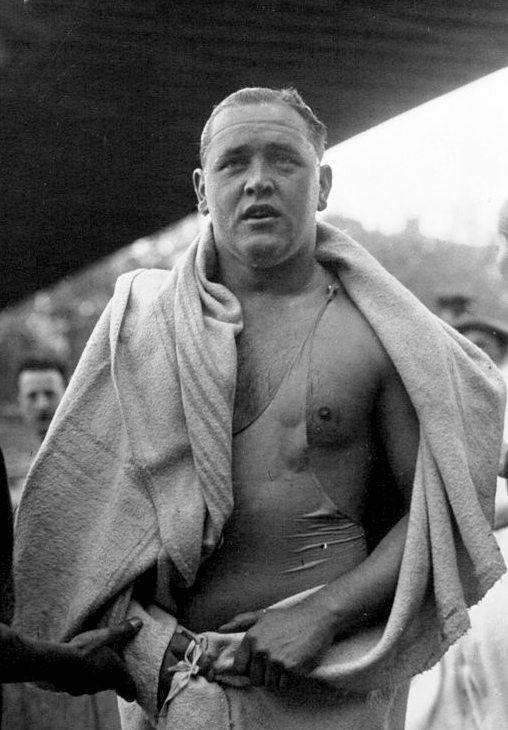
- Albert Vandeplancke in 1931

Personal information
- Born: 2 January 1911 Tourcoing, France
- Died: 1 April 1939 (aged 28) Tourcoing, France

Sport
- Sport: Water polo, swimming
- Club: EN Tourcoing
Medal record
Water polo
Representing France
Olympic Games
Bronze medal – third place	1928 Amsterdam	Team competition

Albert Désiré Vandeplancke (2 January 1911 – 1 April 1939) was a French water polo player and freestyle swimmer who competed at the 1928 Summer Olympics. He won a bronze medal with the French water polo team, and failed to reach the finals of the 400 metre and 4×200 metre swimming events.

== See also ==
- List of Olympic medalists in water polo (men)
