= José Francesch =

Spanish swimmer

Personal information
- Nationality: Spanish
- Born: 18 August 1908 Barcelona, Spain
- Died: 22 August 1964 (aged 56) Barcelona, Spain

Sport
- Sport: Swimming

José Francesch (18 August 1908 – 22 August 1964) was a Spanish swimmer. He competed in the men's 200 metre breaststroke event at the 1928 Summer Olympics.
