= Honorine Delescluse =

French gymnast (1906–1978)

Personal information
- Full name: Honorine Adele Delescluse
- Nationality: French
- Born: 1 April 1906; Tourcoing, France
- Died: 12 February 1978 (aged 71); Tourcoing, France

Sport
- Sport: Gymnastics

Honorine Delescluse (1 April 1906 – 12 February 1978) was a French gymnast. She competed in the women's artistic team all-around event at the 1928 Summer Olympics.

Delescluse was the sister of Louise Delescluse.
