= Louise Delescluse =

French gymnast (1911–2004)

Personal information
- Full name: Louise Pauline Delescluse
- Nationality: French
- Born: 28 August 1911; Tourcoing, France
- Died: 30 December 2004 (aged 93); Roubaix, France

Sport
- Sport: Gymnastics

Louise Delescluse (28 August 1911 – 30 December 2004) was a French gymnast. She competed in the women's artistic team all-around event at the 1928 Summer Olympics.

Delescluse was the sister of Honorine Delescluse.
