= Ernest Rogez =

French water polo player (1908–1986)

Personal information
- Born: March 16, 1908 Tourcoing, France
- Died: March 24, 1986 (aged 78)

Sport
- Sport: Water polo
Medal record
Representing France
Olympic Games
Bronze medal – third place	1928 Amsterdam	Team competition

Ernest Rogez (16 March 1908 – 24 March 1986) was a French water polo player who competed in the 1928 Summer Olympics.

== See also ==
- List of Olympic medalists in water polo (men)
