= Ernst Budig =

German swimmer

Personal information
- Born: 1 January 1908 Cologne, German Empire
- Died: 29 December 1971 (aged 63) Cologne, West Germany

Sport
- Sport: Swimming

Ernst Budig (1 January 1908 – 29 December 1971) was a German swimmer. He competed in the men's 200 metre breaststroke event at the 1928 Summer Olympics.
