= André Crémon =

French modern pentathlete

Personal information
- Full name: André Gustave Robert Édouard Crémon
- Born: 18 November 1893
- Died: 12 October 1970 (aged 76)

Sport
- Sport: Modern pentathlon

André Gustave Robert Édouard Crémon (18 November 1893 – 12 October 1970) was a French modern pentathlete. He competed at the 1928 Summer Olympics.
