= André Cerbonney =

French sprinter

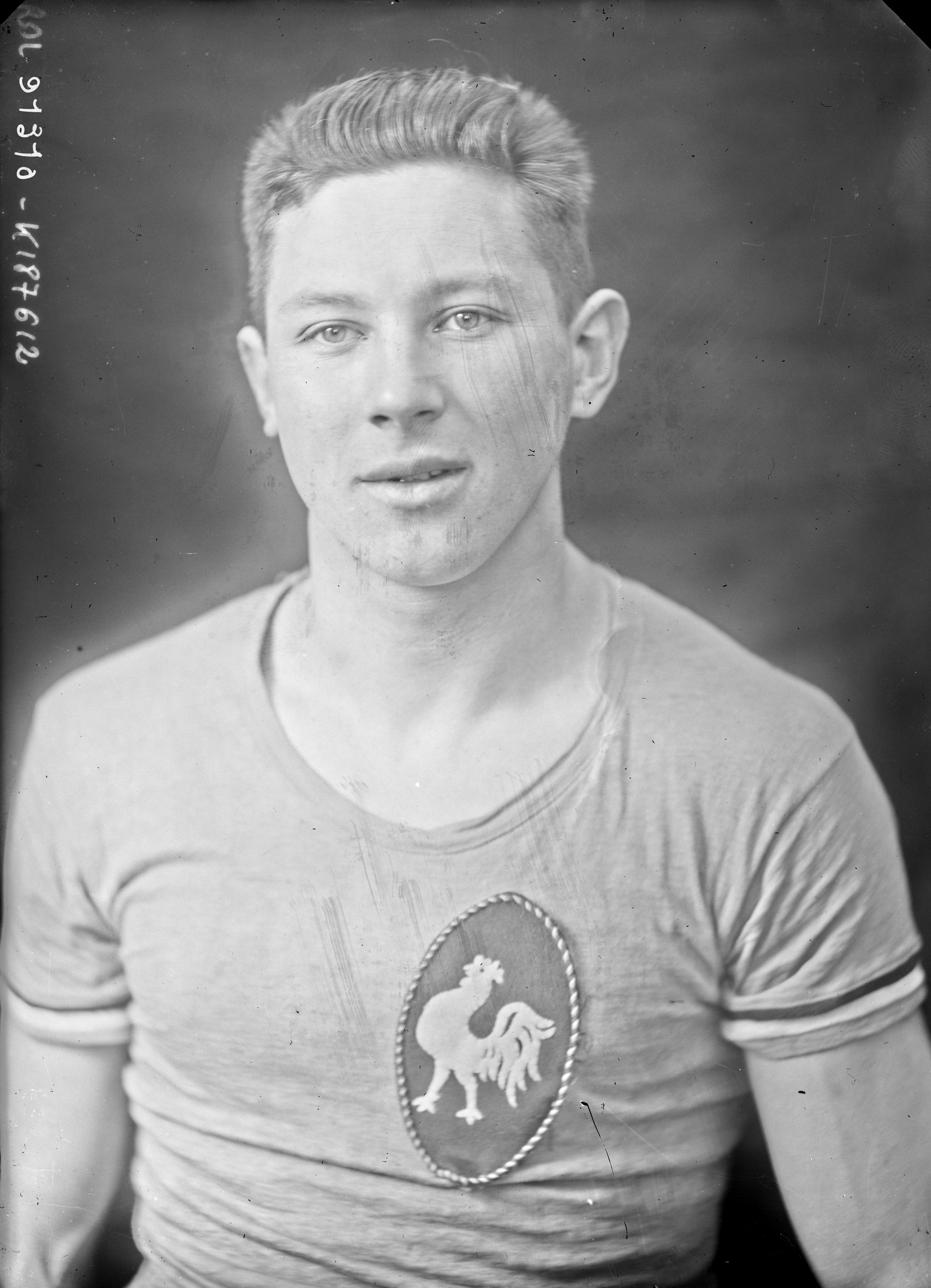
- André Cerbonney in 1924

Personal information
- Nationality: French
- Born: 10 April 1900
- Died: 4 April 1992 (aged 91)

Sport
- Sport: Sprinting
- Event: 100 metres

André Cerbonney (10 April 1900 – 4 April 1992) was a French sprinter. He competed in the men's 100 metres at the 1928 Summer Olympics.
