= Robert Wallon (equestrian) =

French equestrian

Personal information
- Nationality: French
- Born: 16 January 1886; Villers-Cotterêts, France
- Died: 3 April 1973 (aged 87); Maisons-Laffitte, France

Sport
- Sport: Equestrian

Robert Wallon (16 January 1886 – 3 April 1973) was a French equestrian. He competed at the 1924 Summer Olympics and the 1928 Summer Olympics.
