= Louisfert =

Louisfert Lóifèrr (Gallo) Lufer (Breton)
- Commune
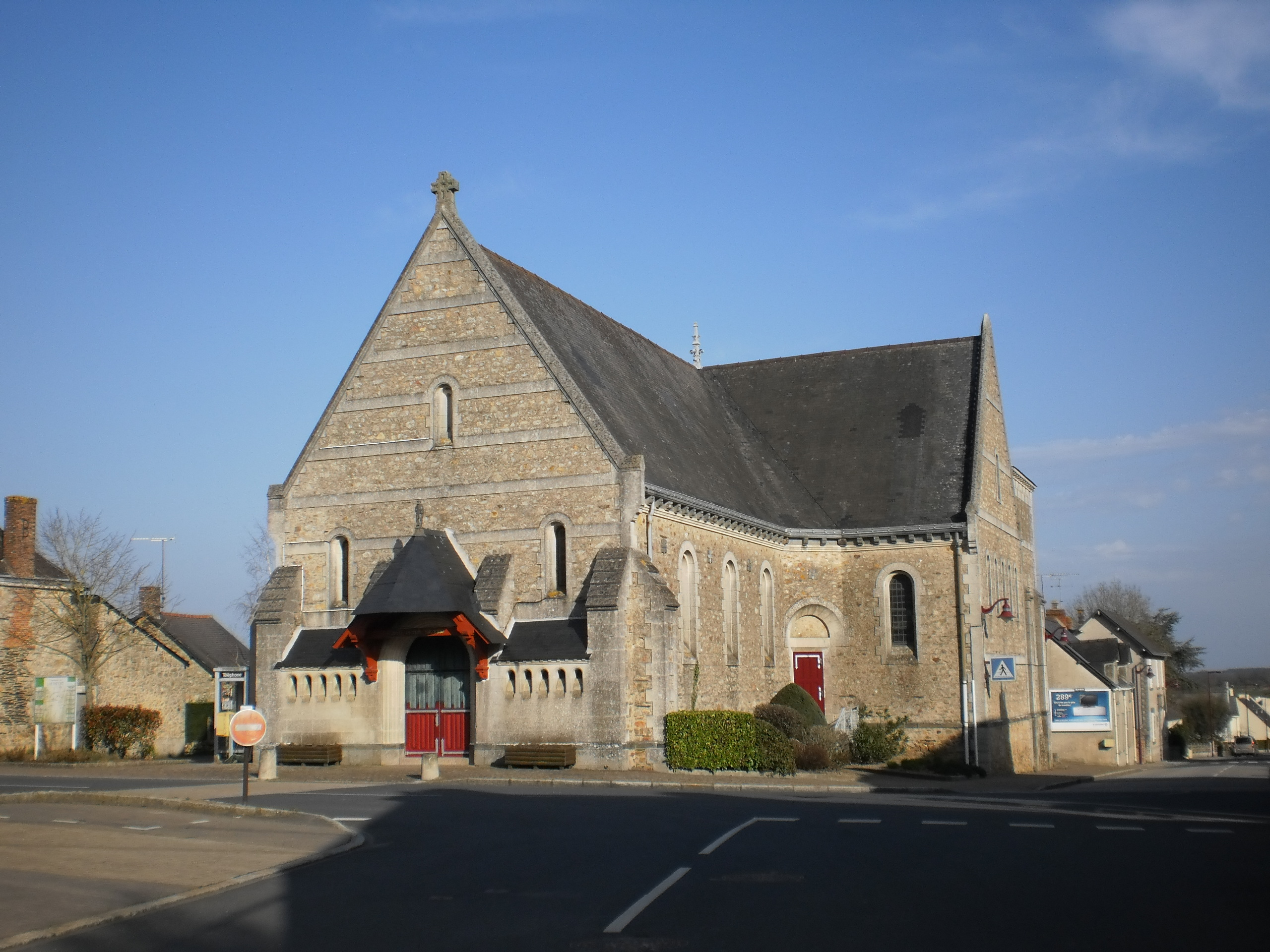

- Coat of arms
- Location of Louisfert
- Location within France Location within Pays de la Loire
- Coordinates: 47°40′33″N 1°25′54″W
- Country: France
- Region: Pays de la Loire
- Department: Loire-Atlantique
- Arrondissement: Châteaubriant-Ancenis
- Canton: Châteaubriant
- Intercommunality: Châteaubriant-Derval

Government
  - Mayor (2020–2026): Alain Guillois
- Area^{1}: 18.16 km^{2} (7.01 sq mi)
- Highest elevation: 87 m (285 ft)
- Lowest elevation: 39 m (128 ft)
- Population (2023): 945
  - Density: 52.0/km^{2} (135/sq mi)
- Time zone: UTC+01:00 (CET)
  - Summer (DST): UTC+02:00 (CEST)
- INSEE/Postal code: 44085 /44110
- ^{1} French Land Register data, which excludes lakes, ponds, glaciers > 1 km^{2} (0.386 sq mi or 247 acres) and river estuaries.

Louisfert (French pronunciation: [lwifɛʁ]; Gallo: Lóifèrr, Breton: Lufer) is a commune in the Loire-Atlantique department in western France.

== Population ==
Historical population
Year	Pop.	±% p.a.
1968	556	—
1975	606	+1.24%
1982	766	+3.40%
1990	817	+0.81%
1999	796	−0.29%
2007	873	+1.16%
2012	918	+1.01%
2017	1,029	+2.31%
2023	945	−1.41%
Source: INSEE

== See also ==
- Communes of the Loire-Atlantique department
- The works of Jean Fréour Sculptor for Louisfert oratory.
