= Claire Horrent =

French swimmer

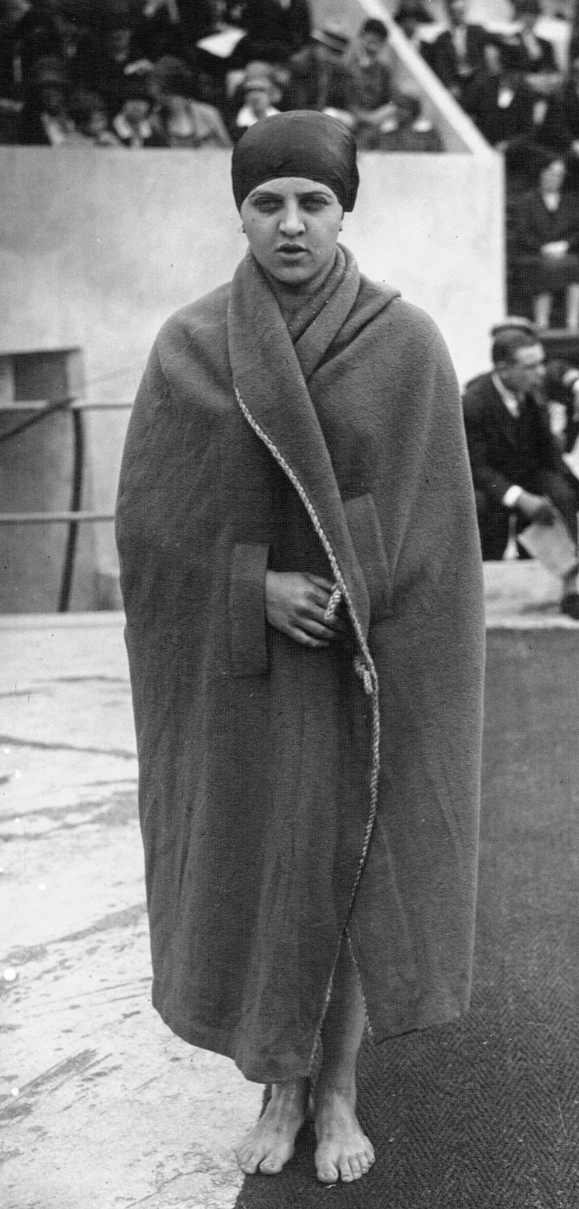
- Claire Horrent in 1927

Personal information
- Born: 21 August 1909
- Died: 16 August 1998 (aged 88)

Sport
- Sport: Swimming
- Club: EN Tourcoing

Claire Horrent (21 August 1909 – 16 August 1998) was a French freestyle swimmer. She competed at the 1928 Summer Olympics in the 100 m and 4 × 100 m relay events and finished fifth in the relay.
