= Léon Tallon =

French swimmer (1908–1980)

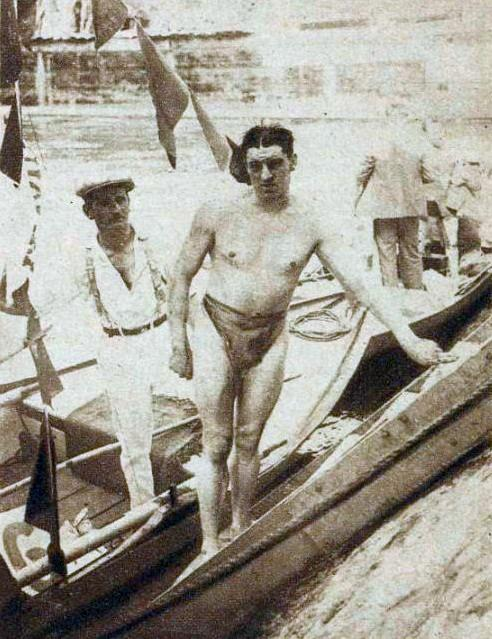

Personal information
- Full name: Léon Tallon
- Nationality: French
- Born: 28 January 1908 Robion, France
- Died: 11 July 1980 (aged 72) Robion, France

Sport
- Sport: Swimming

Léon Tallon (28 January 1908 – 11 July 1980) was a French swimmer. He competed in the men's 200 metre breaststroke event at the 1928 Summer Olympics.
