= Gustave Klein =

French swimmer (1901–1962)

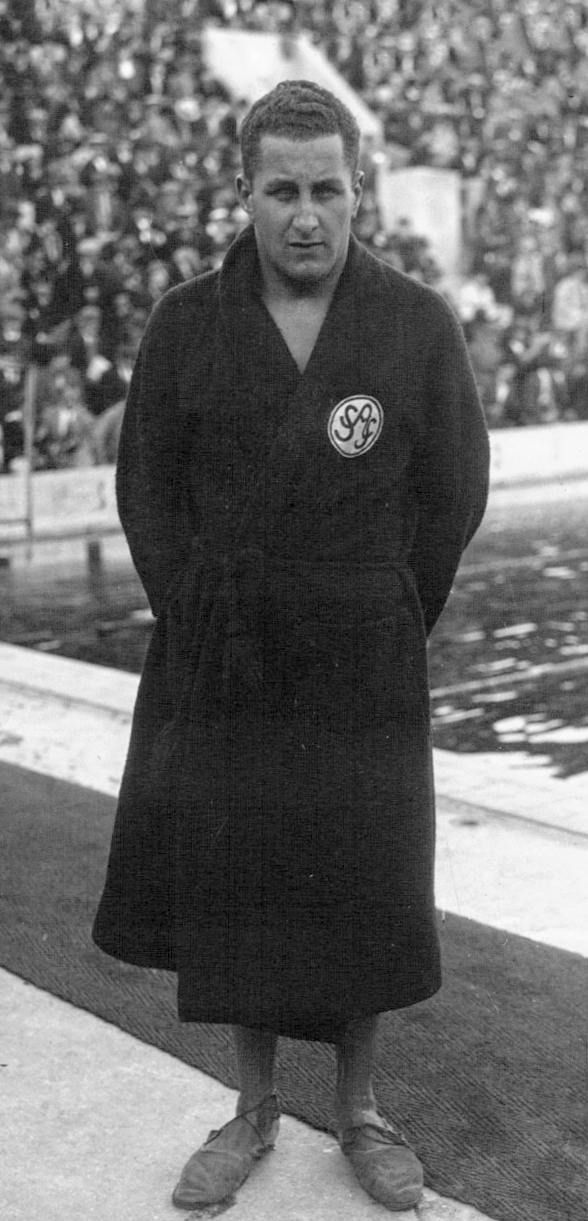
- Gustave Klein in 1927

Personal information
- Born: 28 November 1901 Schiltigheim, France
- Died: 2 January 1962 (aged 60) Strasbourg, France
- Height: 1.78 m (5 ft 10 in)
- Weight: 80 kg (180 lb)

Sport
- Sport: Swimming
- Club: AS Strasbourg

Gustave Klein (28 November 1901 – 2 January 1962) was a French freestyle swimmer who competed at the 1924 and 1928 Summer Olympics. In 1924 he did not finish his 1500 m race, and in 1928 he failed to reach the finals of the 100 m and 4 × 200 m relay events.
