= Georgina Roty =

French swimmer

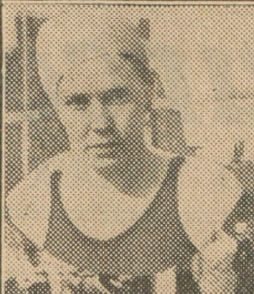

Personal information
- Full name: Georgina Roty
- Born: 31 May 1908 Tourcoing, France
- Died: 27 May 1940 (aged 31) Tourcoing, France

Sport
- Sport: Swimming

Georgina Roty (31 May 1908 – 27 May 1940) was a French swimmer. She competed in two events at the 1928 Summer Olympics. She was killed in an Axis bombing raid during World War II.
