= Georges Leroux =

French gymnast

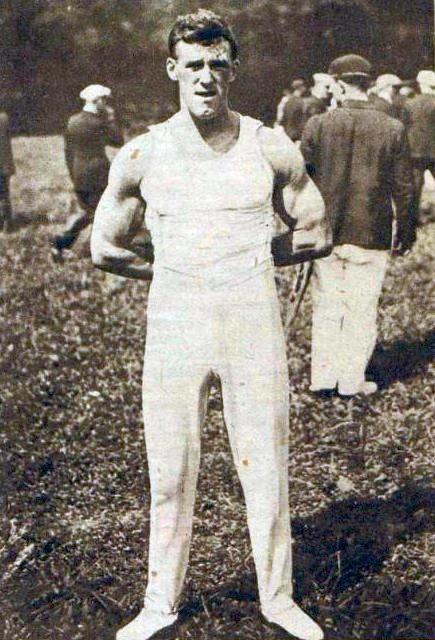
- Leroux in 1931

Personal information
- Born: 1907 Pirmasens, Germany

Gymnastics career
- Discipline: Men's artistic gymnastics
- Country represented: France
- Gym: Société de Gymnastique et de Sport Union Haguenau
Medal record
Men's artistic gymnastics
Representing France
World Championships
Silver medal – second place	1930 Luxembourg	Team
Bronze medal – third place	1931 Paris	All-around

Georges Leroux (born 1907, date of death unknown) was a French gymnast. He competed in seven events at the 1928 Summer Olympics.
