= Louis Bessière =

French cyclist

Personal information
- Full name: Louis Bessière
- Born: September 2, 1902
- Died: 13 August 1978 (aged 75)

Cycling career
- Sport: Cycling

Louis Bessière (September 2, 1902 - August 13, 1978) was a French cyclist. He competed in the individual and team road race events at the 1928 Summer Olympics.
