= Justin Mottier =

French cyclist

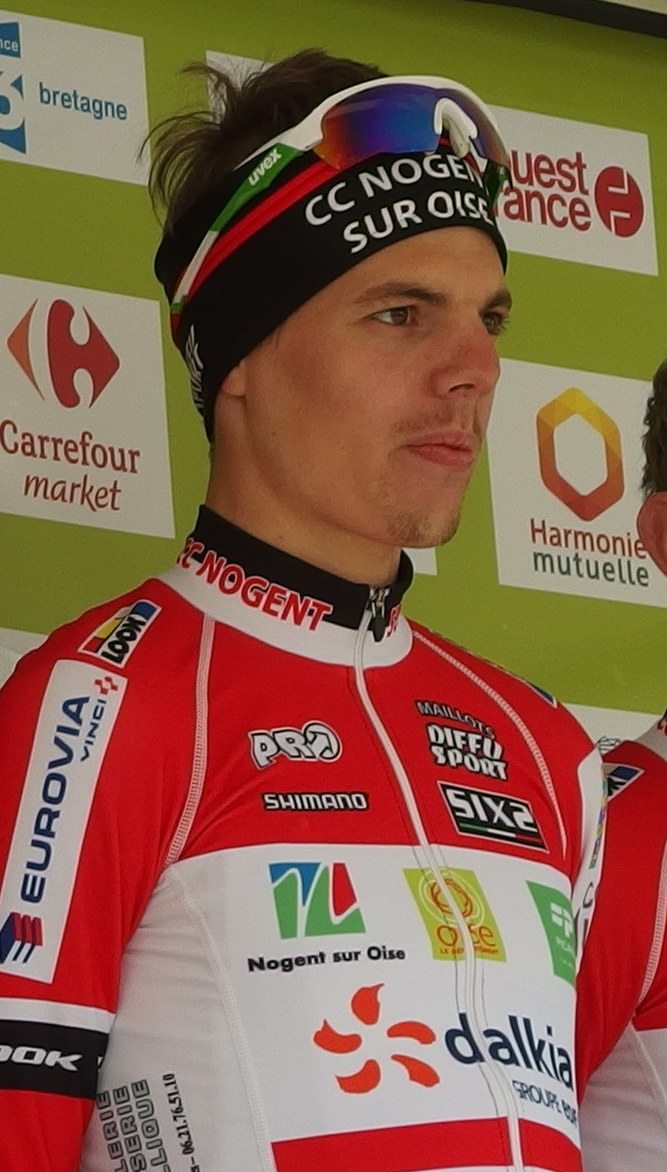
- Mottier at the 2015 Tour de Bretagne

Personal information
- Full name: Justin Mottier
- Born: 14 September 1993 (age 33) Saint-Georges-Buttavent, France
- Height: 1.80 m (5 ft 11 in)
- Weight: 65 kg (143 lb)

Cycling career
- Sport: Cycling
- Current team: Retired
- Disciplines: Road; Cyclo-cross
- Role: Rider

Amateur teams
- 2011: CA Évron
- 2012–2013: UC Cholet 49
- 2014–2015: CC Nogent-sur-Oise
- 2016–2017: VC Pays de Loudéac
- 2021: Laval Cyclisme 53

Professional teams
- 2016: Fortuneo–Vital Concept (stagiaire)
- 2018–2020: Vital Concept

Justin Mottier (born 14 September 1993) is a French former cyclist, who competed as a professional from 2018 to 2020 for Vital Concept.

== Career ==
=== Amateur ===
In 2016, Mottier joined VC Pays de Loudéac, with the goal of eventually moving into the professional ranks. He had a successful season, notably winning the Circuit du Morbihan, La Castelbriantaise and the first stage of the Boucle de l'Artois. He was then selected to ride for the national team in the Grand Prix de Plumelec-Morbihan, where he placed 91st. In August, he was offered to ride for UCI Professional Continental team Fortuneo–Vital Concept as a stagiaire. While riding with the team, Mottier competed in the Tour of Utah and several one-day races in Belgium, including the Grote Prijs Jef Scherens. For the 2017 season, Mottier stayed with VC Pays de Loudéac, most notably placing second overall in the Tour de Normandie.

=== Professional ===
In August 2017, he signed a professional contract for the following season with Vital Concept at the age of 24. Mottier was one of two riders on the team from the Mayenne department, alongside Arnaud Courteille. His first race with the team was the Grand Prix La Marseillaisein late January. In early March, he placed third in the Route Adélie after remaining in the breakaway for 200 kilometers. Two weeks later, he entered his first World Tour events, taking part in the Amstel Gold Race followed by the La Flèche Wallonne.

Mottier had a less successful second season as a professional, with his best result being 18th in the Circuit de Wallonie. Despite this, he remained with the team for a third season in 2020. After falling ill and suffering a fractured collarbone while training in December 2019, Mottier only competed in three races before the Covid-19 pandemic, including the Tour de Langkawi. He returned to racing in August at the Mont Ventoux Dénivelé Challenge, followed by several more races throughout France. However, he lacked success once again and was this time not kept by his team.

After he was not retained by B&B Hotels–Vital Concept, following three years with the team, Mottier announced that he was leaving professional cycling following the 2020 season. In November 2020, it was announced that he would join French amateur team Laval Cyclisme 53, for the 2021 season.

== Major results ==
2011
4th Tour du Morbihan Juniors
10th Overall Le Trophée Centre Morbihan
2012
10th Under-23 Chrono des Nations
2014
1st Stage 3 Trois Jours de Cherbourg
2015
1st Grand Prix de Beaumont-sur-Sarthe
1st GP de Mortagne au Perche
2017
1st La Castelbriantaise
1st Circuit du Morbihan
1st Tour de Rhuys
1st GP Chapelle-Saint-Aubin
1st Stage 1 Tour d'Eure-et-Loir
9th Overall Boucle de l'Artois

1st Stage 1

2017
1st Souvenir René Lochet
1st Stage 3 Saint-Brieuc Agglo Tour
2nd Overall Tour de Normandie
3rd Paris–Évreux
2018
1st Cyclo-cross de Vaiges
3rd Route Adélie
