= Anne Dupire =

French swimmer (1910–1993)

Personal information
- Full name: Anne Dupire
- Born: 17 July 1910 Tourcoing, France
- Died: 23 February 1993 (aged 82) Tourcoing, France

Sport
- Sport: Swimming

Anne Dupire (17 July 1910 – 23 February 1993) was a French freestyle swimmer. She competed in two events at the 1928 Summer Olympics.
