= André Aumerle =

French cyclist

Personal information
- Born: 16 February 1907 Firmi, France
- Died: 24 October 1990 (aged 83) Fontenay-sous-Bois, France

Cycling career
- Sport: Cycling

André Aumerle (16 February 1907 – 24 October 1990) was a French cyclist. He competed in the three events at the 1928 Summer Olympics.

Aumerle finished 8th in the individual road race event, 7th in the team road race, and 4th in the team pursuit 4,000 metres event at the 1928 Olympics.
