= René Brossy =

French cyclist

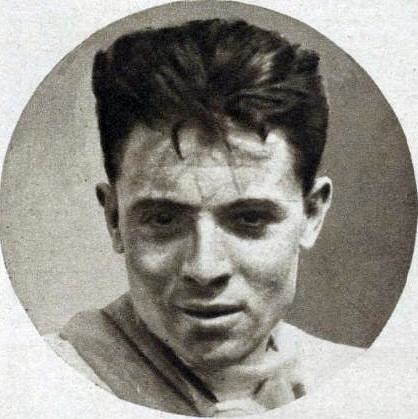
- René Brossy (1929)

Personal information
- Born: 5 April 1906 Paris, France
- Died: 3 December 1991 (aged 85)

Cycling career
- Sport: Cycling

René Brossy (5 April 1906 – 3 December 1991) was a French cyclist. He competed in the three events at the 1928 Summer Olympics.
