= André Lemoine =

French gymnast (1903–1978)

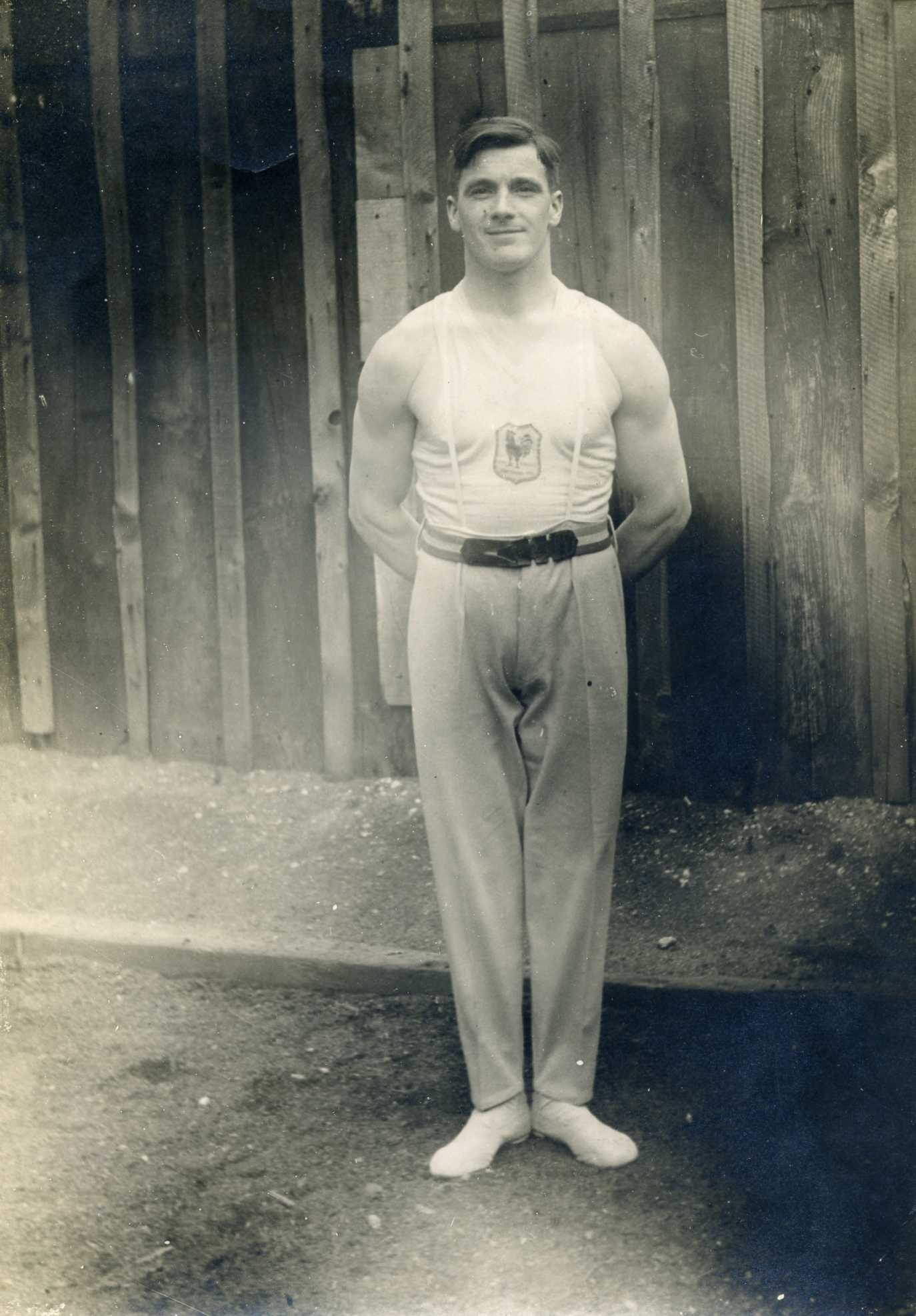
- Lemoine in 1928

Personal information
- Full name: André Germain Alphonse Lemoine
- Born: 25 November 1903 Chartres, France
- Died: 19 June 1978 (aged 74) Chartres, France

Gymnastics career
- Discipline: Men's artistic gymnastics
- Country represented: France
- Gym: Association Jeanne d'Arc de Chartres

André Germain Alphonse Lemoine (25 November 1903 – 19 June 1978) was a French gymnast. He competed in seven events at the 1928 Summer Olympics.
