= List of 1924 Summer Olympics medal winners =

The 1924 Summer Olympics were held in Paris, France, from 5 to 27 July 1924.

== Athletics ==
=== Medal table ===
* Host nation (France)

Rank	Nation	Gold	Silver	Bronze	Total
1	United States	12	10	10	32
2	Finland	10	5	2	17
3	Great Britain	3	3	5	11
4	Italy	1	1	0	2
5	Australia	1	0	0	1
6	Sweden	0	3	2	5
7	Switzerland	0	2	0	2
8	South Africa	0	1	1	2
9	Argentina	0	1	0	1
9	Hungary	0	1	0	1
11	France*	0	0	3	3
12	Estonia	0	0	1	1
12	Netherlands	0	0	1	1
12	New Zealand	0	0	1	1
12	Norway	0	0	1	1
Totals (15 entries)		27	27	27	81

=== Medalists ===
Event	Gold	Silver	Bronze
100 metres	Harold Abrahams; Great Britain	Jackson Scholz; United States	Arthur Porritt; New Zealand
200 metres	Jackson Scholz; United States	Charles Paddock; United States	Eric Liddell; Great Britain
400 metres	Eric Liddell; Great Britain	Horatio Fitch; United States	Guy Butler; Great Britain
800 metres	Douglas Lowe; Great Britain	Paul Martin; Switzerland	Schuyler Enck; United States
1500 metres	Paavo Nurmi; Finland	Willy Schärer; Switzerland	H. B. Stallard; Great Britain
5000 metres	Paavo Nurmi; Finland	Ville Ritola; Finland	Edvin Wide; Sweden
10,000 metres	Ville Ritola; Finland	Edvin Wide; Sweden	Eero Berg; Finland
110 metres hurdles	Daniel Kinsey; United States	Sid Atkinson; South Africa	Sten Pettersson; Sweden
400 metres hurdles	Morgan Taylor; United States	Erik Vilen; Finland	Ivan Riley; United States
3000 metres steeplechase	Ville Ritola; Finland	Elias Katz; Finland	Paul Bontemps; France
4 × 100 metres relay	United States; Loren Murchison; Louis Clarke; Frank Hussey; Alfred LeConey	Great Britain; Harold Abrahams; Walter Rangeley; Wilfred Nichol; Lancelot Royle	Netherlands; Jan de Vries; Jacob Boot; Harry Broos; Marinus van den Berge
4 × 400 metres relay	United States; Commodore Cochran; Alan Helffrich; Oliver MacDonald; William Stevenson	Sweden; Artur Svensson; Erik Byléhn; Gustaf Wejnarth; Nils Engdahl	Great Britain; Edward Toms; George Renwick; Richard Ripley; Guy Butler
3000 metres team race	Finland; Paavo Nurmi; Ville Ritola; Elias Katz	Great Britain; Bertram Macdonald; Herbert Johnston; George Webber	United States; Edward Kirby; William Cox; Willard Tibbetts
Marathon	Albin Stenroos; Finland	Romeo Bertini; Italy	Clarence DeMar; United States
10 kilometres walk	Ugo Frigerio; Italy	Gordon Goodwin; Great Britain	Cecil McMaster; South Africa
Individual cross country	Paavo Nurmi; Finland	Ville Ritola; Finland	Earl Johnson; United States
Team cross country	Finland; Paavo Nurmi; Ville Ritola; Heikki Liimatainen	United States; Earl Johnson; Arthur Studenroth; August Fager	France; Henri Lauvaux; Gaston Heuet; Maurice Norland
High jump	Harold Osborn; United States	Leroy Brown; United States	Pierre Lewden; France
Pole vault	Lee Barnes; United States	Glenn Graham; United States	James Brooker; United States
Long jump	DeHart Hubbard; United States	Edward Gourdin; United States	Sverre Hansen; Norway
Triple jump	Nick Winter; Australia	Luis Brunetto; Argentina	Vilho Tuulos; Finland
Shot put	Bud Houser; United States	Glenn Hartranft; United States	Ralph Hills; United States
Discus throw	Bud Houser; United States	Vilho Niittymaa; Finland	Thomas Lieb; United States
Hammer throw	Fred Tootell; United States	Matt McGrath; United States	Malcolm Nokes; Great Britain
Javelin throw	Jonni Myyrä; Finland	Gunnar Lindström; Sweden	Eugene Oberst; United States
Pentathlon	Eero Lehtonen; Finland	Elemér Somfay; Hungary	Robert LeGendre; United States
Decathlon	Harold Osborn; United States	Emerson Norton; United States	Aleksander Klumberg; Estonia

== Boxing ==
=== Medal table ===
* Host nation (France)

Rank	Nation	Gold	Silver	Bronze	Total
1	United States	2	2	2	6
2	Great Britain	2	2	0	4
3	Denmark	1	2	0	3
4	Belgium	1	0	1	2
4	Norway	1	0	1	2
6	South Africa	1	0	0	1
7	Argentina	0	2	2	4
8	Canada	0	0	1	1
8	France*	0	0	1	1
Totals (9 entries)		8	8	8	24

=== Medalists ===
Games	Gold	Silver	Bronze
Flyweight (−50.8 kg / 112 lb)	Fidel La Barba; United States	James McKenzie; Great Britain	Raymond Fee; United States
Bantamweight (−53.5 kg / 118 lb)	William Smith; South Africa	Salvatore Tripoli; United States	Jean Ces; France
Featherweight (−57.2 kg / 126 lb)	Jackie Fields; United States	Joseph Salas; United States	Pedro Quartucci; Argentina
Lightweight (−61.2 kg / 135 lb)	Hans Jacob Nielsen; Denmark	Alfredo Copello; Argentina	Frederick Boylstein; United States
Welterweight (−66.7 kg / 147 lb)	Jean Delarge; Belgium	Héctor Méndez; Argentina	Douglas Lewis; Canada
Middleweight (−72.6 kg / 160 lb)	Harry Mallin; Great Britain	John Elliott; Great Britain	Joseph Jules Beecken; Belgium
Light heavyweight (−79.4 kg / 175 lb)	Harry Mitchell; Great Britain	Thyge Petersen; Denmark	Sverre Sørsdal; Norway
Heavyweight (over 79.4 kg/175 lb)	Otto von Porat; Norway	Søren Petersen; Denmark	Alfredo Porzio; Argentina

== Cycling ==
=== Medal table ===
* Host nation (France)

Rank	Nation	Gold	Silver	Bronze	Total
1	France*	4	0	2	6
2	Netherlands	1	1	1	3
3	Italy	1	0	0	1
4	Belgium	0	2	1	3
5	Great Britain	0	1	1	2
6	Denmark	0	1	0	1
6	Poland	0	1	0	1
8	Sweden	0	0	1	1
Totals (8 entries)		6	6	6	18

=== Road cycling ===
Games	Gold	Silver	Bronze
Individual time trial	Armand Blanchonnet; France	Henri Hoevenaers; Belgium	René Hamel; France
Team time trial	France; Armand Blanchonnet; René Hamel; André Leducq; Georges Wambst	Belgium; Henri Hoevenaers; Auguste Parfondry; Jean Van Den Bosch; Fernand Saivé	Sweden; Gunnar Sköld; Erik Bohlin; Ragnar Malm; Erik Bjurberg

=== Track cycling ===
Games	Gold	Silver	Bronze
50 km	Ko Willems; Netherlands	Cyril Alden; Great Britain	Harry Wyld; Great Britain
Sprint	Lucien Michard; France	Jacob Meijer; Netherlands	Jean Cugnot; France
Tandem	France; Lucien Choury; Jean Cugnot	Denmark; Edmund Hansen; Willy Hansen	Netherlands; Gerard Bosch van Drakestein; Maurice Peeters
Team pursuit	Italy; Francesco Zucchetti; Angelo De Martini; Alfredo Dinale; Aurelio Menegazzi	Poland; Tomasz Stankiewicz; Franciszek Szymczyk; Józef Lange; Jan Lazarski	Belgium; Jean Van Den Bosch; Léonard Daghelinckx; Henri Hoevenaers; Fernand Saive

== Diving ==
=== Medal table ===
Rank	Nation	Gold	Silver	Bronze	Total
1	United States	4	4	3	11
2	Australia	1	0	0	1
3	Sweden	0	1	1	2
4	Great Britain	0	0	1	1
Totals (4 entries)		5	5	5	15

=== Men's events ===
Event	Gold	Silver	Bronze
3 m springboard	Albert White; United States	Pete Desjardins; United States	Clarence Pinkston; United States
10 m platform	Albert White; United States	David Fall; United States	Clarence Pinkston; United States
Plain high diving	Dick Eve; Australia	John Jansson; Sweden	Harold Clarke; Great Britain

=== Women's events ===
Event	Gold	Silver	Bronze
3 m springboard	Elizabeth Becker-Pinkston; United States	Aileen Riggin; United States	Caroline Fletcher; United States
10 m platform	Caroline Smith; United States	Elizabeth Becker-Pinkston; United States	Hjördis Töpel; Sweden

== Equestrian events ==
=== Medal table ===
* Host nation (France)

Rank	Nation	Gold	Silver	Bronze	Total
1	Sweden	2	2	0	4
2	Netherlands	2	0	0	2
3	Switzerland	1	1	0	2
4	Italy	0	1	1	2
5	Denmark	0	1	0	1
6	France*	0	0	1	1
6	Poland	0	0	1	1
6	Portugal	0	0	1	1
6	United States	0	0	1	1
Totals (9 entries)		5	5	5	15

=== Medalists ===
Games	Gold	Silver	Bronze
Individual dressage	Ernst Linder and Piccolomino (SWE)	Bertil Sandström and Sabel (SWE)	Xavier Lesage and Plumard (FRA)
Individual eventing	Adolph van der Voort van Zijp and Silver Piece (NED)	Frode Kirkebjerg and Meteor (DEN)	Sloan Doak and Pathfinder (USA)
Team eventing	Netherlands; Adolph van der Voort van Zijp and Silver Piece; Charles Pahud de Mortanges and Johnny Walker; Gerard de Kruijff and Addio; Antonius Colenbrander and King of Hearts	Sweden; Claës König and Bojar; Torsten Sylvan and Anita; Gustaf Hagelin and Varius; Carl Gustaf Lewenhaupt and Canter	Italy; Alberto Lombardi and Pimplo; Alessandro Alvisi and Capiligio; Emanuele Beraudo di Pralormo and Mount Félix; Tommaso Lequio di Assaba and Torena
Individual jumping	Alphonse Gemuseus and Lucette (SUI)	Tommaso Lequio di Assaba and Trebecco (ITA)	Adam Królikiewicz and Picador (POL)
Team jumping	Sweden; Åke Thelning and Loke; Axel Ståhle and Cecil; Åge Lundström and Anvers	Switzerland; Alphonse Gemuseus and Lucette; Werner Stuber and Girandole; Hans Bühler and Sailor Boy	Portugal; António Borges and Reginald; Hélder de Souza and Avro; José Mouzinho and Hetrugo

== Fencing ==
=== Medal table ===
* Host nation (France)

Rank	Nation	Gold	Silver	Bronze	Total
1	France*	3	3	0	6
2	Belgium	1	2	1	4
3	Hungary	1	1	2	4
4	Denmark	1	0	1	2
4	Italy	1	0	1	2
6	Great Britain	0	1	0	1
7	Netherlands	0	0	1	1
7	Sweden	0	0	1	1
Totals (8 entries)		7	7	7	21

=== Men's events ===
Event	Gold	Silver	Bronze
Individual épée	Charles Delporte; Belgium	Roger Ducret; France	Nils Hellsten; Sweden
Team épée	France; Lucien Gaudin; Georges Buchard; Roger Ducret; André Labatut; Lionel Liottel; Alexandre Lippmann; Georges Tainturier	Belgium; Paul Anspach; Joseph De Craecker; Charles Delporte; Fernand de Montigny; Ernest Gevers; Léon Tom	Italy; Giulio Basletta; Marcello Bertinetti; Giovanni Canova; Vincenzo Cuccia; Virgilio Mantegazza; Oreste Moricca
Individual foil	Roger Ducret; France	Philippe Cattiau; France	Maurice Van Damme; Belgium
Team foil	France; Lucien Gaudin; Philippe Cattiau; Jacques Coutrot; Roger Ducret; Henri Jobier; André Labattut; Guy de Luget; Joseph Peroteaux	Belgium; Désiré Beurain; Charles Crahay; Fernand de Montigny; Maurice Van Damme; Marcel Berre; Albert De Roocker	Hungary; László Berti; Sándor Pósta; Zoltán Schenker; Ödön Tersztyanszky; István Lichteneckert
Individual sabre	Sándor Pósta; Hungary	Roger Ducret; France	János Garay; Hungary
Team sabre	Italy; Renato Anselmi; Guido Balzarini; Marcello Bertinetti; Bino Bini; Vincenzo Cuccia; Oreste Moricca; Oreste Puliti; Giulio Sarrocchi	Hungary; László Berty; János Garay; Sándor Pósta; József Rády; Zoltán Schenker; László Széchy; Ödön Tersztyánszky; Jenő Uhlyárik	Netherlands; Adrianus De Jong; Jetze Doorman; Hendrik Scherpenhuyzen; Jan Van Der Wiel; Maarten Hendrik Van Dulm; Henri Jacob Wynoldy-Daniels

=== Women's event ===
Event	Gold	Silver	Bronze
Individual foil	Ellen Osiier; Denmark	Gladys Davis; Great Britain	Grete Heckscher; Denmark

== Football ==
=== Medal table ===
Rank	Nation	Gold	Silver	Bronze	Total
1	Uruguay	1	0	0	1
2	Switzerland	0	1	0	1
3	Sweden	0	0	1	1
Totals (3 entries)		1	1	1	3

=== Medalists ===
Event	Gold	Silver	Bronze
Men's	Uruguay; José Leandro Andrade; Pedro Arispe; Pedro Casella; Pedro Cea; Luis Chiappara; Pedro Etchegoyen; Alfredo Ghierra; Andrés Mazali; José Nasazzi; José Naya; Pedro Petrone; Ángel Romano; Zoilo Saldombide; Héctor Scarone; Pascual Somma; Humberto Tomasina; Antonio Urdinarán; Santos Urdinarán; Fermín Uriarte; José Vidal; Alfredo Zibechi; Pedro Zingone	Switzerland; Max Abegglen; Félix Bédouret; Charles Bouvier; Walter Dietrich; Karl Ehrenbolger; Paul Fässler; Gustav Gottenkieny; Jean Haag; Marcel Katz; Edmond Kramer; Adolphe Mengotti; August Oberhauser; Robert Pache; Aron Pollitz; Hans Pulver; Rudolf Ramseyer; Adolphe Reymond; Louis Richard; Teo Schär; Paul Schmiedlin; Paul Sturzenegger; Walter Weiler	Sweden; Axel Alfredsson; Charles Brommesson; Gustaf Carlsson; Albin Dahl; Sven Friberg; Karl Gustafsson; Fritjof Hillén; Konrad Hirsch; Gunnar Holmberg; Per Kaufeldt; Tore Keller; Rudolf Kock; Sigfrid Lindberg; Vigor Lindberg; Sven Lindqvist; Evert Lundqvist; Sten Mellgren; Gunnar Olsson; Sven Rydell; Harry Sundberg; Thorsten Svensson; Robert Zander

== Gymnastics ==
=== Medal table ===
* Host nation (France)

Rank	Nation	Gold	Silver	Bronze	Total
1	Switzerland	2	2	3	7
2	Italy	2	0	1	3
3	Yugoslavia	2	0	0	2
4	Czechoslovakia	1	4	4	9
5	France*	1	4	1	6
6	United States	1	0	0	1
Totals (6 entries)		9	10	9	28

=== Medalists ===
Games	Gold	Silver	Bronze
Individual all-around	Leon Štukelj; Yugoslavia	Robert Pražák; Czechoslovakia	Bedřich Šupčík; Czechoslovakia
Team all-around	Italy; Luigi Cambiaso; Mario Lertora; Vittorio Lucchetti; Luigi Maiocco; Ferdinando Mandrini; Francesco Martino; Giuseppe Paris; Giorgio Zampori	France; Eugène Cordonnier; Léon Delsarte; François Gangloff; Jean Gounot; Arthur Hermann; André Higelin; Joseph Huber; Albert Séguin	Switzerland; Hans Grieder; August Güttinger; Jean Gutweninger; Georges Miez; Otto Pfister; Antoine Rebetez; Carl Widmer; Josef Wilhelm
Horizontal bar	Leon Štukelj; Yugoslavia	Jean Gutweninger; Switzerland	André Higelin; France
Parallel bars	August Güttinger; Switzerland	Robert Pražák; Czechoslovakia	Giorgio Zampori; Italy
Pommel horse	Josef Wilhelm; Switzerland	Jean Gutweninger; Switzerland	Antoine Rebetez; Switzerland
Rings	Francesco Martino; Italy	Robert Pražák; Czechoslovakia	Ladislav Vácha; Czechoslovakia
Rope climbing	Bedřich Šupčík; Czechoslovakia	Albert Séguin; France	Ladislav Vácha; Czechoslovakia
Rope climbing	Bedřich Šupčík; Czechoslovakia	Albert Séguin; France	August Güttinger; Switzerland
Sidehorse vault	Albert Séguin; France	Jean Gounot; France	none awarded (as there was a tie for silver)
Sidehorse vault	Albert Séguin; France	François Gangloff; France	none awarded (as there was a tie for silver)
Vault	Frank Kriz; United States	Jan Koutný; Czechoslovakia	Bohumil Mořkovský; Czechoslovakia

== Modern pentathlon ==
=== Medal table ===
Rank	Nation	Gold	Silver	Bronze	Total
1	Sweden	1	1	1	3
Totals (1 entries)		1	1	1	3

=== Medalists ===
Event	Gold	Silver	Bronze
Individual	Bo Lindman; Sweden	Gustaf Dyrssen; Sweden	Bertil Uggla; Sweden

== Polo ==
=== Medal table ===
Rank	Nation	Gold	Silver	Bronze	Total
1	Argentina	1	0	0	1
2	United States	0	1	0	1
3	Great Britain	0	0	1	1
Totals (3 entries)		1	1	1	3

=== Medalists ===
Event	Gold	Silver	Bronze
Men's	Argentina; Arturo Kenny; Juan Miles; Guillermo Naylor; Juan Nelson; Enrique Padilla	United States; Elmer Boeseke; Tommy Hitchcock, Jr. Fred Roe; Rodman Wanamaker	Great Britain; Frederick W. Barrett; Dennis Bingham; Fred Guest; Kinnear Wise

== Rowing ==
=== Medal table ===
* Host nation (France)

Rank	Nation	Gold	Silver	Bronze	Total
1	United States	2	1	2	5
2	Switzerland	2	0	3	5
3	Great Britain	2	0	0	2
4	Netherlands	1	0	0	1
5	France*	0	3	0	3
6	Canada	0	2	0	2
7	Italy	0	1	1	2
Totals (7 entries)		7	7	6	20

=== Medalists ===
Event	Gold	Silver	Bronze
Single sculls	Jack Beresford; Great Britain	William Gilmore; United States	Josef Schneider; Switzerland
Double sculls	United States; Paul Costello; John B. Kelly Sr.	France; Marc Detton; Jean-Pierre Stock	Switzerland; Rudolf Bosshard; Heini Thoma
Coxless pair	Netherlands; Teun Beijnen; Willy Rösingh	France; Maurice Monney-Bouton; Georges Piot	none awarded
Coxed pair	Switzerland; Édouard Candeveau; Alfred Felber; Émile Lachapelle	Italy; Ercole Olgeni; Giovanni Scatturin; Gino Sopracordevole	United States; Leon Butler; Harold Wilson; Edward Jennings
Coxless four	Great Britain; Maxwell Eley; James MacNabb; Robert Morrison; Terence Sanders	Canada; Archibald Black; George MacKay; Colin Finlayson; William Wood	Switzerland; Émile Albrecht; Alfred Probst; Eugen Sigg; Hans Walter
Coxed four	Switzerland; Émile Albrecht; Alfred Probst; Eugen Sigg; Hans Walter; Walter Lossli	France; Eugène Constant; Louis Gressier; Georges Lecointe; Raymond Talleux; Marcel Lepan	United States; Bob Gerhardt; Sid Jelinek; Ed Mitchell; Henry Welsford; John Kennedy
Eight	United States; Leonard Carpenter; Howard Kingsbury; Alfred Lindley; John Miller; James Rockefeller; Frederick Sheffield; Benjamin Spock; Alfred Wilson; Laurence Stoddard	Canada; Arthur Bell; Robert Hunter; William Langford; Harold Little; John Smith; Warren Snyder; Norman Taylor; William Wallace; Ivor Campbell	Italy; Antonio Cattalinich; Francesco Cattalinich; Simeone Cattalinich; Giuseppe Crivelli; Latino Galasso; Pietro Ivanov; Bruno Sorich; Carlo Toniatti; Vittorio Gliubich

== Rugby union ==
=== Medal table ===
* Host nation (France)

Rank	Nation	Gold	Silver	Bronze	Total
1	United States	1	0	0	1
2	France*	0	1	0	1
3	Romania	0	0	1	1
Totals (3 entries)		1	1	1	3

=== Medalists ===
Event	Gold	Silver	Bronze
Men's	United States; R. Brown; John Cashel; Philip Clark; Norman Cleaveland; Hugh Cunningham; Dudley DeGroot; Robert Devereux; George Dixon; Charles Doe; Linn Farrish; Edward Graff; Charles Grondona; Joseph Hunter; Richard Hyland; Caesar Mannelli; Charles Mehan; John Muldoon; William Muldoon; John O'Neil; John Patrick; William Rogers; Rudolph Scholz; Colby Slater; Norman Slater; Charles Lee Tilden, Jr. Edward Turkington; Alan Valentine; Alan Williams	France; Fernande Abraham; René Araou; Jean Bayard; Louis Béguet; André Béhotéguy; Marcel Besson; Alexandre Bioussa; Étienne Bonnes; François Borde; Adolphe Bousquet; Aimé Cassayet-Armagnac; Etienne Cayrol; François Clauzel; Clément Dupont; Albert Dupouy; Jean Etcheberry; Ernest Frayssinet; Henri Galau; Gilbert Gérintès; Charles Gonnet; Raoul Got; Adolphe Jauréguy; René Lasserre; Louis Lepatey; Marcel-Frédéric Lubin-Lebrère; Camille Montade; Roger Piteu; Étienne Piquiral; Eugène Ribère; Jean Vaysse	Romania; Nicolae Anastasiade; Dumitru Armăşel; Gheorghe Benția; Ion Cociociaho; Constantin Cratunescu; Teodor Florian; Petre Ghiţulescu; Ion Gîrleşteanu; Octav Luchide; Jean Henry Manu; Nicolae Mărăscu; Teodor Marian; Sorin Mihăilescu; Paul Nedelcovici; Iosif Nemes; Eugen Sfetescu; Mircea Sfetescu; Soare Sterian; Mircea Stroescu; Atanasie Tănăsescu; Mihai Vardală; Paul Vidraşcu; Dumitru Volvoreanu

== Sailing ==
=== Medal table ===
* Host nation (France)

Rank	Nation	Gold	Silver	Bronze	Total
1	Norway	2	1	0	3
2	Belgium	1	0	0	1
3	Denmark	0	1	0	1
3	Great Britain	0	1	0	1
5	Finland	0	0	1	1
5	France*	0	0	1	1
5	Netherlands	0	0	1	1
Totals (7 entries)		3	3	3	9

=== Medalists ===
Games	Gold	Silver	Bronze
Monotype	Léon Huybrechts; Belgium	Henrik Robert; Norway	Hans Dittmar; Finland
6 metre	Norway; Anders Lundgren; Christopher Dahl; Eugen Lunde	Denmark; Vilhelm Vett; Knud Degn; Christian Nielsen	Netherlands; Johan Carp; Anthonij Guépin; Jan Vreede
8 metre	Norway; Carl Ringvold; Rick Bockelie; Harald Hagen; Ingar Nielsen; Carl Ringvold Jr.	Great Britain; Ernest Roney; Harold Fowler; Edwin Jacob; Thomas Riggs; Walter Riggs	France; Louis Breguet; Pierre Gauthier; Robert Girardet; André Guerrier; Georges Mollard

== Shooting ==
=== Medal table ===
* Host nation (France)

Rank	Nation	Gold	Silver	Bronze	Total
1	United States	5	2	2	9
2	Norway	2	1	1	4
3	Great Britain	1	2	0	3
4	France*	1	1	0	2
5	Hungary	1	0	0	1
6	Sweden	0	2	2	4
7	Finland	0	1	2	3
8	Canada	0	1	0	1
9	Denmark	0	0	1	1
9	Haiti	0	0	1	1
9	Switzerland	0	0	1	1
Totals (11 entries)		10	10	10	30

=== Medalists ===
Games	Gold	Silver	Bronze
25 m rapid fire pistol	Henry Bailey; United States	Vilhelm Carlberg; Sweden	Lennart Hannelius; Finland
50 m rifle standing	Pierre Coquelin de Lisle; France	Marcus Dinwiddie; United States	Josias Hartmann; Switzerland
600 m free rifle	Morris Fisher; United States	Carl Osburn; United States	Niels Larsen; Denmark
Team free rifle	United States; Raymond Coulter; Joseph Crockett; Morris Fisher; Sidney Hinds; Walter Stokes	France; Paul Colas; Albert Courquin; Pierre Hardy; Georges Roes; Émile Rumeau	Haiti; Ludovic Augustin; Destin Destine; Eloi Metullus; Astrel Rolland; Ludovic Valborge
100 m running deer, single shots	John Boles; United States	Cyril Mackworth-Praed; Great Britain	Otto Olsen; Norway
100 m running deer, double shots	Ole Lilloe-Olsen; Norway	Cyril Mackworth-Praed; Great Britain	Alfred Swahn; Sweden
Team running deer, single shots	Norway; Einar Liberg; Ole Lilloe-Olsen; Harald Natvig; Otto Olsen	Sweden; Otto Hultberg; Mauritz Johansson; Fredric Landelius; Alfred Swahn	United States; John Boles; Raymond Coulter; Dennis Fenton; Walter Stokes
Team running deer, double shots	Great Britain; Cyril Mackworth-Praed; Philip Neame; Herbert Perry; Allen Whitty	Norway; Einar Liberg; Ole Lilloe-Olsen; Harald Natvig; Otto Olsen	Sweden; Axel Ekblom; Mauritz Johansson; Fredric Landelius; Alfred Swahn
Trap	Gyula Halasy; Hungary	Konrad Huber; Finland	Frank Hughes; United States
Team trap	United States; Frederick Etchen; Frank Hughes; Samuel Sharman; William Silkworth; John Noel; Clarence Platt	Canada; George Beattie; John Black; Robert Montgomery; Samuel Vance; William Barnes; Samuel Newton	Finland; Werner Ekman; Konrad Huber; Robert Huber; Toivo Tikkanen; Georg Nordblad; Magnus Wegelius

== Swimming ==
=== Medal table ===
Rank	Nation	Gold	Silver	Bronze	Total
1	United States	9	5	5	19
2	Great Britain	1	2	1	4
3	Australia	1	1	2	4
4	Sweden	0	2	2	4
5	Belgium	0	1	0	1
6	Hungary	0	0	1	1
Totals (6 entries)		11	11	11	33

=== Men's events ===
Games	Gold	Silver	Bronze
100 m freestyle	Johnny Weissmuller; United States	Duke Kahanamoku; United States	Samuel Kahanamoku; United States
400 m freestyle	Johnny Weissmuller; United States	Arne Borg; Sweden	Boy Charlton; Australia
1500 m freestyle	Boy Charlton; Australia	Arne Borg; Sweden	Frank Beaurepaire; Australia
100 m backstroke	Warren Kealoha; United States	Paul Wyatt; United States	Károly Bartha; Hungary
200 m breaststroke	Bob Skelton; United States	Joseph De Combe; Belgium	Bill Kirschbaum; United States
4 × 200 m freestyle relay	United States; Ralph Breyer; Harry Glancy; Dick Howell; Wally O'Connor; Johnny Weissmuller	Australia; Frank Beaurepaire; Boy Charlton; Moss Christie; Ernest Henry; Ivan Stedman	Sweden; Åke Borg; Arne Borg; Thor Henning; Gösta Persson; Orvar Trolle; Georg Werner

=== Women's events ===
Games	Gold	Silver	Bronze
100 m freestyle	Ethel Lackie; United States	Mariechen Wehselau; United States	Gertrude Ederle; United States
400 m freestyle	Martha Norelius; United States	Helen Wainwright; United States	Gertrude Ederle; United States
100 m backstroke	Sybil Bauer; United States	Phyllis Harding; Great Britain	Aileen Riggin; United States
200 m breaststroke	Lucy Morton; Great Britain	Agnes Geraghty; United States	Gladys Carson; Great Britain
4 × 100 m freestyle relay	United States; Euphrasia Donnelly; Gertrude Ederle; Ethel Lackie; Mariechen Wehselau	Great Britain; Florence Barker; Constance Jeans; Grace McKenzie; Iris Tanner	Sweden; Aina Berg; Gurli Ewerlund; Wivan Pettersson; Hjördis Töpel

== Tennis ==
=== Medal table ===
* Host nation (France)

Rank	Nation	Gold	Silver	Bronze	Total
1	United States	5	1	0	6
2	France*	0	3	1	4
3	Great Britain	0	1	2	3
4	Italy	0	0	1	1
4	Netherlands	0	0	1	1
Totals (5 entries)		5	5	5	15

=== Medalists ===
Event	Gold	Silver	Bronze
Men's singles	Vincent Richards; United States	Henri Cochet; France	Uberto De Morpurgo; Italy
Men's doubles	United States; Vincent Richards; Francis Hunter	France; Jacques Brugnon; Henri Cochet	France; Jean Borotra; René Lacoste
Women's singles	Helen Wills; United States	Julie Vlasto; France	Kathleen McKane; Great Britain
Women's doubles	United States; Hazel Wightman; Helen Wills	Great Britain; Phyllis Covell; Kathleen McKane	Great Britain; Evelyn Colyer; Dorothy Shepherd-Barron
Mixed doubles	United States; Hazel Wightman; R. Norris Williams	United States; Marion Jessup; Vincent Richards	Netherlands; Kea Bouman; Hendrik Timmer

== Water polo ==
=== Medal table ===
* Host nation (France)

Rank	Nation	Gold	Silver	Bronze	Total
1	France	1	0	0	1
2	Belgium	0	1	0	1
3	United States	0	0	1	1
Totals (3 entries)		1	1	1	3

=== Medalists ===
Event	Gold	Silver	Bronze
Men's	France; Albert Delborgies; Noël Delberghe; Robert Desmettre; Paul Dujardin; Albert Mayaud; Henri Padou; Georges Rigal R. Bertrand; A. Fasani; Jean Lasquin; L. Perol	Belgium; Gérard Blitz; Maurice Blitz; Joseph Cludts; Joseph de Combe; Pierre Dewin; Albert Durant; Georges Fleurix; Paul Gailly; Joseph Pletinckx; Jules Thiry; Jean-Pierre Vermetten	United States; Arthur Austin; Oliver Horn; Fred Lauer; George Mitchell; John Norton; Wally O'Connor; George Schroth; Herb Vollmer; Johnny Weissmuller Elmer Collett; Jam Handy

Note: The players above the line played at least one game in this tournament, the players below the line were reserve players and did not compete in this tournament. Nevertheless the International Olympic Committee medal database exclusively credits them all as medalists. However the official report did not even count them as competitors.

== Weightlifting ==
=== Medal table ===
* Host nation (France)

Rank	Nation	Gold	Silver	Bronze	Total
1	Italy	3	0	0	3
2	France*	2	0	0	2
3	Austria	0	3	1	4
4	Estonia	0	1	2	3
5	Switzerland	0	1	1	2
6	Czechoslovakia	0	0	1	1
Totals (6 entries)		5	5	5	15

=== Medalists ===
Games	Gold	Silver	Bronze
60 kg	Pierino Gabetti; Italy	Andreas Stadler; Austria	Arthur Reinmann; Switzerland
67.5 kg	Edmond Decottignies; France	Anton Zwerina; Austria	Bohumil Durdis; Czechoslovakia
75 kg	Carlo Galimberti; Italy	Alfred Neuland; Estonia	Jaan Kikkas; Estonia
82.5 kg	Charles Rigoulot; France	Fritz Hünenberger; Switzerland	Leopold Friedrich; Austria
+82.5 kg	Giuseppe Tonani; Italy	Franz Aigner; Austria	Harald Tammer; Estonia

== Wrestling ==
=== Medal table ===
* Host nation (France)

Rank	Nation	Gold	Silver	Bronze	Total
1	Finland	4	7	5	16
2	United States	4	1	1	6
3	Switzerland	2	1	2	5
4	Sweden	1	2	1	4
5	Estonia	1	0	1	2
6	France*	1	0	0	1
7	Hungary	0	1	1	2
8	Belgium	0	1	0	1
9	Great Britain	0	0	1	1
9	Japan	0	0	1	1
Totals (10 entries)		13	13	13	39

=== Freestyle ===
Games	Gold	Silver	Bronze
Bantamweight	Kustaa Pihlajamäki; Finland	Kaarlo Mäkinen; Finland	Bryan Hines; United States
Featherweight	Robin Reed; United States	Chester Newton; United States	Katsutoshi Naito; Japan
Lightweight	Russell Vis; United States	Volmar Wikström; Finland	Arvo Haavisto; Finland
Welterweight	Hermann Gehri; Switzerland	Eino Leino; Finland	Otto Müller; Switzerland
Middleweight	Fritz Hagmann; Switzerland	Pierre Ollivier; Belgium	Vilho Pekkala; Finland
Light Heavyweight	John Spellman; United States	Rudolf Svensson; Sweden	Charles Courant; Switzerland
Heavyweight	Harry Steel; United States	Henri Wernli; Switzerland	Archie MacDonald; Great Britain

=== Greco-Roman ===
Games	Gold	Silver	Bronze
Bantamweight	Eduard Pütsep; Estonia	Anselm Ahlfors; Finland	Väinö Ikonen; Finland
Featherweight	Kalle Anttila; Finland	Aleksanteri Toivola; Finland	Eric Malmberg; Sweden
Lightweight	Oskari Friman; Finland	Lajos Keresztes; Hungary	Källe Westerlund; Finland
Middleweight	Edvard Westerlund; Finland	Arthur Lindfors; Finland	Roman Steinberg; Estonia
Light Heavyweight	Carl Westergren; Sweden	Rudolf Svensson; Sweden	Onni Pellinen; Finland
Heavyweight	Henri Deglane; France	Edil Rosenqvist; Finland	Rajmund Badó; Hungary
