= Switzerland at the 1924 Summer Olympics =

- IOC code: SUI
- NOC: Swiss Olympic Association

in Paris
- Competitors: 141 (136 men, 5 women) in 17 sports
- Medals Ranked 6th: Gold 7 Silver 8 Bronze 10 Total 25

Summer Olympics appearances (overview)
- 1896; 1900; 1904; 1908; 1912; 1920; 1924; 1928; 1932; 1936; 1948; 1952; 1956; 1960; 1964; 1968; 1972; 1976; 1980; 1984; 1988; 1992; 1996; 2000; 2004; 2008; 2012; 2016; 2020; 2024

Other related appearances
- 1906 Intercalated Games

Switzerland competed at the 1924 Summer Olympics in Paris, France. 141 competitors, 136 men and 5 women, took part in 74 events in 17 sports.

== Medalists ==
| Medal | Name | Sport | Event | Date |
|---|---|---|---|---|
| Gold | Alphonse Gemuseus | Equestrian | Individual jumping | July 27 |
| Gold | August Güttinger | Gymnastics | Men's parallel bars | July 18 |
| Gold | Josef Wilhelm | Gymnastics | Men's pommel horse | July 23 |
| Gold | Édouard Candeveau, Alfred Felber, Émile Lachapelle | Rowing | Men's coxed pair | July 17 |
| Gold | Emile Albrecht, Walter Lossli, Alfred Probst, Eugen Sigg, Hans Walter | Rowing | Men's coxed four | July 17 |
| Gold | Hermann Gehri | Wrestling | Men's freestyle welterweight | July 14 |
| Gold | Fritz Hagmann | Wrestling | Men's freestyle middleweight | July 14 |
| Silver | Paul Martin | Athletics | Men's 800 m | July 7 |
| Silver | Willy Schärer | Athletics | Men's 1500 m | July 10 |
| Silver | Hans Bühler, Alphonse Gemuseus, Werner Stuber | Equestrian | Team jumping | July 27 |
| Silver | Switzerland national football team: Max Abegglen; Félix Bédouret; Charles Bouvier; Walter Dietrich; Karl Ehrenbolger; Paul Fässler; Gustav Gottenkieny; Jean Haag; Marcel Katz; Edmond Kramer; Adolphe Mengotti; August Oberhauser; Robert Pache; Aron Pollitz; Hans Pulver; Rudolf Ramseyer; Adolphe Reymond; Louis Richard; Teo Schär; Paul Schmiedlin; Paul Sturzenegger; Walter Weiler | Football | | June 9 |
| Silver | Jean Gutweniger | Gymnastics | Men's horizontal bar | July 17 |
| Silver | Jean Gutweniger | Gymnastics | Men's pommel horse | July 23 |
| Silver | Fritz Hünenberger | Weightlifting | Men's 82.5 kg | July 23 |
| Silver | Henri Wernli | Wrestling | Men's freestyle heavyweight | July 14 |
| Bronze | Hans Grieder, August Güttinger, Jean Gutweniger, Georges Miez, Otto Pfister, Antoine Rebetez, Carl Widmer, Josef Wilhelm | Gymnastics | Men's team all-around | July 23 |
| Bronze | Antoine Rebetez | Gymnastics | Men's pommel horse | July 23 |
| Bronze | August Güttinger | Gymnastics | Men's rope climbing | July 20 |
| Bronze | Josef Schneider | Rowing | Men's single sculls | July 17 |
| Bronze | Rudolf Bosshard, Heini Thoma | Rowing | Men's double sculls | July 17 |
| Bronze | Emile Albrecht, Alfred Probst, Eugen Sigg, Hans Walter | Rowing | Men's coxless four | July 17 |
| Bronze | Josias Hartmann | Shooting | Men's 50 m rifle, prone | June 23 |
| Bronze | Arthur Reinmann | Weightlifting | Men's 60 kg | July 21 |
| Bronze | Otto Müller | Wrestling | Men's freestyle welterweight | July 14 |
| Bronze | Charles Courant | Wrestling | Men's freestyle light heavyweight | July 14 |

== Aquatics ==
=== Diving ===
A single diver represented Switzerland in 1924. It was the nation's second appearance in the sport.

Ranks given are within the heat.

Men

| Diver | Event | Semifinals | | | Final | | |
| Diver | Event | Points | Score | Rank | Points | Score | Rank |
|---|---|---|---|---|---|---|---|
| Arthur Bischoff | 3 m board | 29 | 385 | 6 | did not advance | | |

=== Swimming ===
Ranks given are within the heat.

Men

| Swimmer | Event | Heats | | Semifinals | | Final | |
| Swimmer | Event | Result | Rank | Result | Rank | Result | Rank |
|---|---|---|---|---|---|---|---|
| Charles Kopp | 100 m freestyle | 1:15.0 | 4 | did not advance | | | |
| Robert Wyss | 200 m breaststroke | 3:03.6 | 2 Q | 3:04.2 | 3 q | 3:05.6 | 5 |

=== Water polo ===
Switzerland made its second Olympic water polo appearance.

Roster

- Charles Biefer
- Armand Boppart
- Henri Demiéville
- Robert Girod
- Charles Kopp
- Albert Moret
- Fernand Moret
- P. Renevier
- H. Rich
- René Ricolfi-Doria
- Robert Wyss

First round

| Netherlands | 7–0 | Switzerland | Piscine des Tourelles |

== Athletics ==
Seventeen athletes represented Switzerland in 1924. It was the nation's fifth appearance in the sport. Martin and Schärer each won a silver medal—Switzerland's first medals in Olympic athletics.

Ranks given are within the heat.

| Athlete | Event | Heats | | Quarterfinals | | Semifinals | | Final | |
| Athlete | Event | Result | Rank | Result | Rank | Result | Rank | Result | Rank |
|---|---|---|---|---|---|---|---|---|---|
| Karl Borner | 100 m | Unknown | 3 | did not advance | | | | | |
| Karl Borner | 200 m | Unknown | 3 | did not advance | | | | | |
| Constant Bucher | Pentathlon | N/A | | | | | | Elim-3 | |
| Constant Bucher | Decathlon | N/A | | | | | | 5961.5925 | 15 |
| Otto Garnus | Shot put | N/A | | | | 12.12 | 8 | did not advance | |
| Otto Garnus | Discus throw | N/A | | | | 35.16 | 11 | did not advance | |
| Ernst Gerspach | Decathlon | N/A | | | | | | 6743.530 | 6 |
| Josef Imbach | 400 m | 51.8 | 1 Q | 48.0 OR | 1 Q | 48.3 | 2 Q | did not finish | |
| William Marthé | 5000 m | N/A | | | | did not finish | | did not advance | |
| Paul Martin | 800 m | N/A | | 2:00.2 | 1 Q | 1:55.6 | 3 Q | 1:52.6 | 2nd place, silver medalist(s) |
| Adolf Meier | Long jump | N/A | | | | 6.61 | 5 | did not advance | |
| Adolf Meier | Decathlon | N/A | | | | | | did not finish | |
| Victor Moriaud | 100 m | Unknown | 4 | did not advance | | | | | |
| Victor Moriaud | 110 m hurdles | N/A | | Unknown | 3 | did not advance | | | |
| Willi Moser | 110 m hurdles | N/A | | Unknown | 2 Q | 16.1 | 5 | did not advance | |
| Willi Moser | Javelin throw | N/A | | | | 46.80 | 13 | did not advance | |
| Werner Nüesch | Shot put | N/A | | | | 12.45 | 5 | did not advance | |
| Werner Nüesch | Discus throw | N/A | | | | 38.205 | 6 | did not advance | |
| Willy Schärer | 1500 m | N/A | | | | 4:06.6 | 1 Q | 3:55.0 | 2nd place, silver medalist(s) |
| Arthur Tell Schwab | 10 km walk | N/A | | | | Unknown | 3 Q | 49:50.0 | 5 |
| Christian Simmen | 400 m | Unknown | 5 | did not advance | | | | | |
| Walter Strebi | 100 m | 11.2 | 2 Q | did not start | | did not advance | | | |
| Hans Wipf | Javelin throw | N/A | | | | 48.57 | 10 | did not advance | |
| Karl Borner; Heinz Hemmi; Josef Imbach; Victor Moriaud | 4 × 100 m relay | N/A | | 42.2 | 1 Q | 42.2 | 2 Q | Disqualified | |

== Boxing ==
Seven boxers represented Switzerland at the 1924 Games. It was the nation's second appearance in the sport. Stauffer became the first Swiss boxer to reach the quarterfinals.

| Boxer | Weight class | Round of 32 | Round of 16 | Quarterfinals | Semifinals | Final / Bronze match | |
| Boxer | Weight class | Opposition Score | Opposition Score | Opposition Score | Opposition Score | Opposition Score | Rank |
|---|---|---|---|---|---|---|---|
| Georges Givel | Middleweight | Steichen (LUX); W | Elliott (GBR); L | did not advance | | | 9 |
| R. Nyffeler | Flyweight | Bye | Rennie (CAN); L | did not advance | | | 9 |
| Jacques Sauthier | Featherweight | Bye | Petrarca (ITA); L | did not advance | | | 9 |
| Louis Sauthier | Welterweight | Delarge (BEL); L | did not advance | | | | 17 |
| Erich Siebert | Middleweight | Bye | Mallin (GBR); L | did not advance | | | 9 |
| Théodore Stauffer | Welterweight | Decker (AUT); W | Santoro (ARG); W | Dwyer (IRL); L | did not advance | | 5 |
| Johann Weidel | Bantamweight | Bye | Sánchez (ESP); L | did not advance | | | 9 |

| Opponent nation | Wins | Losses | Percent |
|---|---|---|---|
| Argentina | 1 | 0 | .000 |
| Austria | 1 | 0 | .000 |
| Belgium | 0 | 1 | .000 |
| Canada | 0 | 1 | .000 |
| Great Britain | 0 | 2 | .000 |
| Ireland | 0 | 1 | .000 |
| Italy | 0 | 1 | .000 |
| Luxembourg | 1 | 0 | .000 |
| Spain | 0 | 1 | .000 |
| Total | 4 | 6 | .400 |

| Round | Wins | Losses | Percent |
|---|---|---|---|
| Round of 32 | 2 | 1 | .667 |
| Round of 16 | 1 | 5 | .167 |
| Quarterfinals | 0 | 1 | .000 |
| Semifinals | 0 | 0 | – |
| Final | 0 | 0 | – |
| Bronze match | 0 | 0 | – |
| Total | 4 | 6 | .400 |

== Cycling ==
Nine cyclists represented Switzerland in 1924. It was the nation's debut in the sport. The Swiss were perhaps the most successful nation not to win a medal; Blattmann took fifth in the individual time trial, the Swiss team took fourth in the team time trial, and Mermillod reached the semifinals of the sprint.

=== Road cycling ===
| Cyclist | Event | Final | |
| Cyclist | Event | Result | Rank |
|---|---|---|---|
| Georges Antenen | Time trial | 6:53:27.0 | 21 |
| Albert Blattmann | Time trial | 6:34:09.0 | 5 |
| Fritz Bossi | Time trial | 7:05:43.4 | 28 |
| Otto Lehner | Time trial | 6:43:39.0 | 14 |
| Georges Antenen; Albert Blattmann; Fritz Bossi; Otto Lehner | Team time trial | 20:11:15.0 | 4 |

=== Track cycling ===
Ranks given are within the heat.

| Cyclist | Event | First round | | First repechage | | Quarterfinals | | Second repechage | | Semifinals | | Final | |
| Cyclist | Event | Result | Rank | Result | Rank | Result | Rank | Result | Rank | Result | Rank | Result | Rank |
|---|---|---|---|---|---|---|---|---|---|---|---|---|---|
| Louis Mermillod | Sprint | Unknown | 2 r | Unknown | 1 Q | Unknown | 2 r | Unknown | 1 Q | Unknown | 3 | did not advance | |
| Ernst Leutert; Arnold Nötzli; Ernst Richli; Gustav Weilenmann | Team pursuit | 5:23.0 | 1 Q | N/A | | 5:21.6 | 2 | N/A | | did not advance | | | |

== Equestrian ==
Nine equestrians represented Switzerland in 1924. It was the nation's debut in the sport. Gemuseus led the jumping team to a strong debut, taking the individual gold and propelling the team to a silver medal. The eventing team placed fourth.

| Equestrian | Event | Final | | |
| Equestrian | Event | Score | Time | Rank |
|---|---|---|---|---|
| Hans Bühler | Eventing | 1477.5 | N/A | 14 |
| Hans Bühler | Jumping | 24.00 | 2:20.0 | 20 |
| René de Ribeaupierre | Eventing | 904.5 | N/A | 28 |
| Werner Fehr | Eventing | 1395.0 | N/A | 18 |
| Alphonse Gemuseus | Jumping | 6.00 | 2:24.4 | 1st place, gold medalist(s) |
| Adolphe Mercier | Dressage | 223.6 | N/A | 16 |
| Charles Schlumberger | Dressage | 189.4 | N/A | 21 |
| Charles Stoffel | Eventing | 1466.0 | N/A | 15 |
| Werner Stuber | Dressage | 206.2 | N/A | 20 |
| Werner Stuber | Jumping | 20.00 | 2:32.4 | 14 |
| Hans von der Weid | Dressage | 243.2 | N/A | 7 |
| Hans von der Weid | Jumping | 24.00 | 2:39.8 | 21 |
| Hans Bühler; René de Ribeaupierre; Werner Fehr; Charles Stoffel | Team eventing | 4338.5 | N/A | 4 |
| Hans Bühler; Alphonse Gemuseus; Werner Stuber; Hans von der Weid | Team jumping | 50.00 | N/A | 2nd place, silver medalist(s) |

== Fencing ==
Ten fencers, seven men and three women, represented Switzerland in 1924. It was the nation's third appearance in the sport; Switzerland was one of nine nations to send women to the first Olympic women's fencing competition.

Men

Ranks given are within the pool.

| Fencer | Event | Round 1 | | Round 2 | | Quarterfinals | | Semifinals | | Final | |
| Fencer | Event | Result | Rank | Result | Rank | Result | Rank | Result | Rank | Result | Rank |
|---|---|---|---|---|---|---|---|---|---|---|---|
| John Albaret | Foil | 3–1 | 3 Q | 0–5 | 6 | did not advance | | | | | |
| Constantin Antoniades | Épée | 3–6 | 8 | N/A | | did not advance | | | | | |
| Eugène Empeyta | Épée | 6–2 | 1 Q | N/A | | 6–3 | 1 Q | 4–7 | 7 | did not advance | |
| Eugène Empeyta | Foil | 0–3 | 4 | did not advance | | | | | | | |
| Édouard Fitting | Foil | Bye | | 2–3 | 5 | did not advance | | | | | |
| Frédéric Fitting | Épée | 5–3 | 4 Q | N/A | | 9–1 | 1 Q | 3–8 | 12 | did not advance | |
| Frédéric Fitting | Foil | 2–1 | 1 Q | 2–3 | 4 | did not advance | | | | | |
| Henri Jacquet | Épée | 5–4 | 3 Q | N/A | | 6–3 | 3 Q | 4–7 | 10 | did not advance | |
| John Albaret; Constantin Antoniades; Eugène Empeyta; Frédéric Fitting; Henri Jacquet | Team épée | 1–0 | 1 Q | N/A | | 0–2 | 3 | did not advance | | | |
| John Albaret; Constantin Antoniades; Eugène Empeyta; Édouard Fitting; Frédéric Fitting; Charles Rochat | Team foil | Bye | | N/A | | 1–2 | 3 | did not advance | | | |

Women

Ranks given are within the pool.

| Fencer | Event | Quarterfinals | | Semifinals | | Final | |
| Fencer | Event | Result | Rank | Result | Rank | Result | Rank |
|---|---|---|---|---|---|---|---|
| Suzanne Bonnard | Foil | 1–4 | 5 | did not advance | | | |
| Emma Fitting | Foil | 3–3 | 3 Q | 1–4 | 5 | did not advance | |
| Jeanne Morgenthaler | Foil | 1–4 | 6 | did not advance | | | |

== Football ==
Switzerland competed in the Olympic football tournament for the first (and, as of 2008, only) time in 1924. The Swiss took the silver medal, losing the final to Uruguay.

Round 1

May 25, 1924

| Switzerland | 9–0 | Lithuania |
|---|---|---|
| Sturzenegger 2' 43' 68' 85'; Dietrich 14'; Abegglen 41' 50' 58'; Ramseyer 63' (pen.) | Report |

Stade Pershing
Attendance: 8,110
Referee: A. Scamoni (ITA)

Round 2

May 28, 1924

| Switzerland | 1–1 (a.e.t.) | Czechoslovakia |
|---|---|---|
| Dietrich 79' | Report | Sloup 21' (pen.) |

Stade Bergeyre
Attendance: 12,000
Referee: P. Chr. Andersen (NOR)
May 30, 1924

| Switzerland | 1–0 | Czechoslovakia |
|---|---|---|
| Pache 87' | Report |

Stade Bergeyre
Attendance: 10,000
Referee: Marcel Slawik (FRA)

Quarterfinals

June 2, 1924

| Switzerland | 2–1 | Italy |
|---|---|---|
| Sturzenegger 47'; Abegglen 60' | Report | Della Valle 52' |

Stade Bergeyre
Attendance: 12,000
Referee: Johannes Mutters (NED)

Semifinals

June 5, 1924

| Switzerland | 2–1 | Sweden |
|---|---|---|
| Abegglen 15' 77' | Report | Kock 41' |

Stade Olympique, Colombes
Attendance: 7,448
Referee: Mihaly Ivancsics (HUN)

Final

June 9, 1924
16:30

| Uruguay | 3–0 | Switzerland |
|---|---|---|
| Petrone 9'; Cea 65'; Romano 82' | Report |

Stade Olympique, Colombes
Attendance: 41,000
Referee: Marcel Slawik (FRA)

Final rank

== Gymnastics ==
Eight gymnasts represented Switzerland in 1924. It was the nation's fourth appearance in the sport, and first since 1904. The team took bronze. Güttinger, the top all-around individual at seventh place, won two apparatus medals: the gold in the parallel bars and the bronze in the rope climbing. Gutweninger had a pair as well, with silvers in the horizontal bar and the pommel horse. Wilhelm (gold) and Rebetez (bronze) had one medal each, as the Swiss swept the pommel horse medals, with Widmer finishing fourth as well.

=== Artistic ===
| Gymnast | Event | Final | |
| Gymnast | Event | Score | Rank |
|---|---|---|---|
| Hans Grieder | All-around | 99.646 | 22 |
| Hans Grieder | Horizontal bar | 16.946 | 24 |
| Hans Grieder | Parallel bars | 20.94 | 12 |
| Hans Grieder | Pommel horse | 18.440 | 15 |
| Hans Grieder | Rings | 17.070 | 43 |
| Hans Grieder | Rope climbing | 10 (9.0 s) | 18 |
| Hans Grieder | Sidehorse vault | 9.17 | 29 |
| Hans Grieder | Vault | 7.08 | 41 |
| August Güttinger | All-around | 105.176 | 7 |
| August Güttinger | Horizontal bar | 18.886 | 8 |
| August Güttinger | Parallel bars | 21.63 | 1st place, gold medalist(s) |
| August Güttinger | Pommel horse | 19.600 | 8 |
| August Güttinger | Rings | 17.570 | 37 |
| August Güttinger | Rope climbing | 10 (7.8 s) | 3rd place, bronze medalist(s) |
| August Güttinger | Sidehorse vault | 8.41 | 48 |
| August Güttinger | Vault | 9.08 | 17 |
| Jean Gutweninger | All-around | 102.342 | 14 |
| Jean Gutweninger | Horizontal bar | 19.236 | 2nd place, silver medalist(s) |
| Jean Gutweninger | Parallel bars | 21.26 | 8 |
| Jean Gutweninger | Pommel horse | 21.130 | 2nd place, silver medalist(s) |
| Jean Gutweninger | Rings | 17.846 | 32 |
| Jean Gutweninger | Rope climbing | 6 (9.8 s) | 35 |
| Jean Gutweninger | Sidehorse vault | 8.50 | 46 |
| Jean Gutweninger | Vault | 8.37 | 23 |
| Georges Miez | All-around | 98.796 | 23 |
| Georges Miez | Horizontal bar | 19.050 | 5 |
| Georges Miez | Parallel bars | 20.36 | 21 |
| Georges Miez | Pommel horse | 18.830 | 14 |
| Georges Miez | Rings | 16.486 | 45 |
| Georges Miez | Rope climbing | 7 (9.6 s) | 31 |
| Georges Miez | Sidehorse vault | 8.70 | 42 |
| Georges Miez | Vault | 8.17 | 25 |
| Otto Pfister | All-around | 95.746 | 28 |
| Otto Pfister | Horizontal bar | 16.920 | 25 |
| Otto Pfister | Parallel bars | 18.96 | 39 |
| Otto Pfister | Pommel horse | 18.430 | 16 |
| Otto Pfister | Rings | 17.246 | 41 |
| Otto Pfister | Rope climbing | 7 (9.6 s) | 31 |
| Otto Pfister | Sidehorse vault | 8.86 | 39 |
| Otto Pfister | Vault | 8.33 | 24 |
| Antoine Rebetez | All-around | 89.583 | 38 |
| Antoine Rebetez | Horizontal bar | 19.053 | 4 |
| Antoine Rebetez | Parallel bars | 19.08 | 35 |
| Antoine Rebetez | Pommel horse | 20.730 | 3rd place, bronze medalist(s) |
| Antoine Rebetez | Rings | 17.920 | 30 |
| Antoine Rebetez | Rope climbing | 5 (10.2 s) | 41 |
| Antoine Rebetez | Sidehorse vault | 7.80 | 62 |
| Antoine Rebetez | Vault | 0.00 | 67 |
| Carl Widmer | All-around | 94.936 | 32 |
| Carl Widmer | Horizontal bar | 16.190 | 31 |
| Carl Widmer | Parallel bars | 19.76 | 31 |
| Carl Widmer | Pommel horse | 20.500 | 4 |
| Carl Widmer | Rings | 16.996 | 44 |
| Carl Widmer | Rope climbing | 9 (9.2 s) | 23 |
| Carl Widmer | Sidehorse vault | 7.66 | 63 |
| Carl Widmer | Vault | 4.83 | 57 |
| Josef Wilhelm | All-around | 97.096 | 25 |
| Josef Wilhelm | Horizontal bar | 17.150 | 22 |
| Josef Wilhelm | Parallel bars | 21.40 | 4 |
| Josef Wilhelm | Pommel horse | 21.230 | 1st place, gold medalist(s) |
| Josef Wilhelm | Rings | 17.386 | 40 |
| Josef Wilhelm | Rope climbing | 4 (10.4 s) | 45 |
| Josef Wilhelm | Sidehorse vault | 9.06 | 34 |
| Josef Wilhelm | Vault | 6.87 | 46 |
| Hans Grieder; August Güttinger; Jean Gutweninger; Georges Miez; Otto Pfister; Antoine Rebetez; Carl Widmer; Josef Wilhelm | Team | 816.661 | 3rd place, bronze medalist(s) |

== Rowing ==
11 rowers represented Switzerland in 1924. It was the nation's second appearance in the sport. All five of the Swiss boats won medals, including two golds and three bronzes.

Ranks given are within the heat.

| Rower | Event | Semifinals | | Repechage | | Final | |
| Rower | Event | Result | Rank | Result | Rank | Result | Rank |
|---|---|---|---|---|---|---|---|
| Josef Schneider | Single sculls | 7:15.6 | 1 Q | Advanced directly | | 8:01.1 | 3rd place, bronze medalist(s) |
| Rudolf Bosshard; Heini Thoma | Double sculls | 6:55.0 | 1 Q | N/A | | Unknown | 3rd place, bronze medalist(s) |
| Édouard Candeveau; Alfred Felber; Émile Lachapelle | Coxed pair | 7:49.6 | 1 Q | N/A | | 8:39.0 | 1st place, gold medalist(s) |
| Émile Albrecht; Alfred Probst; Eugen Sigg; Hans Walter | Coxless four | Unknown | 2 Q | N/A | | Unknown | 3rd place, bronze medalist(s) |
| Émile Albrecht; Walter Loosli; Alfred Probst; Eugen Sigg; Hans Walter; Emile Lachapelle | Coxed four | Unknown | 2 r | 7:27.2 | 1 Q | 7:18.4 | 1st place, gold medalist(s) |

== Sailing ==
A single sailor represented Switzerland in 1924. It was the nation's second appearance in the sport, and first since 1900. Switzerland had the only female sailor in 1924.

| Sailor | Event | Qualifying | | | | Final | | | |
| Sailor | Event | Race 1 | Race 2 | Race 3 | Total | Race 1 | Race 2 | Total | Rank |
|---|---|---|---|---|---|---|---|---|---|
| Ella Maillart | Olympic monotype | 5 | 3 | N/A | | did not advance | | | |

== Shooting ==
Seven sport shooters represented Switzerland in 1924.

| Shooter | Event | Final | |
| Shooter | Event | Score | Rank |
|---|---|---|---|
| Josias Hartmann | 50 m rifle, prone | 394 | 3rd place, bronze medalist(s) |
| Walter Lienhard | 50 m rifle, prone | 390 | 10 |
| Jakob Reich | 50 m rifle, prone | 392 | 7 |
| Jakob Reich | 600 m free rifle | 81 | 31 |
| Arnold Rösli | 600 m free rifle | 79 | 35 |
| Willy Schnyder | 50 m rifle, prone | 376 | 41 |
| Conrad Stucheli | 600 m free rifle | 82 | 24 |
| Albert Tröndle | 600 m free rifle | 73 | 51 |
| Jakob Reich; Arnold Rösli; Willy Schnyder; Conrad Stucheli; Albert Tröndle | Team free rifle | 635 | 4 |

== Tennis ==
Men

| Athlete | Event | Round of 128 | Round of 64 | Round of 32 | Round of 16 | Quarterfinals | Semifinals | Final | |
| Athlete | Event | Opposition Score | Opposition Score | Opposition Score | Opposition Score | Opposition Score | Opposition Score | Opposition Score | Rank |
|---|---|---|---|---|---|---|---|---|---|
| Charles Aeschlimann | Singles | Bye | Dumas (ARG); W 7–5, 6–4, 6–0 | von Kehrling (HUN); L 6–4, 8–6, 5–7, 2–6, 3–6 | did not advance | | | | |
| Pablo Debran | Singles | McCrea (IRL); W 6–4, 6–4, 6–0 | de Morpurgo (ITA); L 2–6, 3–6, 3–6 | did not advance | | | | | |
| Maurice Ferrier | Singles | Schybergson (FIN); W 6–4, 6–3, 6–3 | Jacob (IND); L 7–5, 3–6, 1–6, 1–6 | did not advance | | | | | |
| Hans Syz | Singles | Bye | Spence (RSA); L 3–6, 2–6, 5–7 | did not advance | | | | | |
| Charles Aeschlimann; Maurice Ferrier | Doubles | —N/a | Bye | Žemla / Koželuh (TCH); L 4–6, 6–3, 6–4, 6–4 | did not advance | | | | |
| Pablo Debran; Hanns Syz | Doubles | —N/a | McCrea / Ireland (IRL); W 4–6, 6–2, 6–2, 1–6, 6–4 | Tegner / Ulrich (DEN); L 6–3, 0–6, 0–6, 1–6 | did not advance | | | | |

== Weightlifting ==
| Athlete | Event | 1H Snatch | 1H Clean & Jerk | Press | Snatch | Clean & Jerk | Total | Rank |
|---|---|---|---|---|---|---|---|---|
| Albert Aeschmann | Men's -75 kg | 67.5 | 87.5 | 82.5 | 87.5 | 117.5 | 442.5 | 5 |
| Felix Bichsel | Men's -67.5 kg | 70 | 95 | 65 | 75 | 105 | 410 | 8 |
| Jules van Gunten | Men's -67.5 kg | 65 | 77.5 | 72.5 | 75 | 100 | 390 | 15 |
| Fritz Hünenberger | Men's -82.5 kg | 80 | 107.5 | 80 | 97.5 | 125 | 490 | 2nd place, silver medalist(s) |
| Joseph Jaquenoud | Men's -67.5 kg | 65 | 85 | 77.5 | 85 | 105 | 417.5 | 5 |
| Edgar Juillerat | Men's -60 kg | 55 | 70 | 67.5 | 75 | 100 | 367.5 | 8 |
| Eugène Peney | Men's +82.5 kg | | | | | | DNF | — |
| Arthur Reinmann | Men's -60 kg | 57.5 | 70 | 80 | 75 | 100 | 382.5 | 3rd place, bronze medalist(s) |
| Anton Schärer | Men's -82.5 kg | 75 | 85 | 100 | 95 | 120 | 475 | 7 |

== Wrestling ==
=== Freestyle wrestling ===
Men's

| Athlete | Event | Round of 32 | Round of 16 | Quarterfinal | Semifinal | Final | |
| Athlete | Event | Opposition Result | Opposition Result | Opposition Result | Opposition Result | Opposition Result | Rank |
|---|---|---|---|---|---|---|---|
| Édouard Belet | Lightweight | —N/a | Bacon (GBR); W | Gardiner (GBR); L | did not advance | | |
| Auguste Corti | Lightweight | —N/a | Haavisto (FIN); L | did not advance | | | |
| Charles Courant | Light heavyweight | —N/a | Strack (USA); W | Hansen (DEN); W | Svensson (SWE); L Bronze medal semifinal Bye | Bronze medal final Bye | 3rd place, bronze medalist(s) |
| Hermann Gehri | Welterweight | —N/a | Fichu (FRA); W | Johnson (USA); W | Leino (FIN); W | Lookabough (USA); W | 1st place, gold medalist(s) |
| Fritz Hagemann | Middleweight | —N/a | Christoffersen (DEN); W | Penttilä (FIN); W | Rhys (GBR); W | Ollivier (BEL); W | 1st place, gold medalist(s) |
| Otto Müller | Welterweight | —N/a | Lookabough (USA); L | Did not advance | Bronze medal semifinal Stockton (CAN); W | Bronze medal final Johnson (USA); W | 3rd place, bronze medalist(s) |
| Fritz Roth | Light heavyweight | —N/a | Hansen (DEN); L | did not advance | | | |
| Hans Roth | Heavyweight | —N/a | Nyström (FIN); W | Pohjala (FIN); L | did not advance | | |
| Ernst Tognetti | Middleweight | —N/a | Rowe (GBR); W | Ollivier (BEL); L | Bronze medal semifinal Penttilä (FIN); L | did not advance | |
| Henri Wernli | Heavyweight | —N/a | Dame (FRA); W | Richthoff (SWE); W | Steele (USA); L Silver medal semifinal Nilsson (SWE); W | Silver medal final MacDonald (GBR); W | 2nd place, silver medalist(s) |

=== Greco-Roman ===
Men's

| Athlete | Event | First round | Second round | Third round | Fourth round | Fifth round | Sixth round | Seventh round | Eighth round | Rank |
| Athlete | Event | Opposition Result | Opposition Result | Opposition Result | Opposition Result | Opposition Result | Opposition Result | Opposition Result | Opposition Result | Rank |
|---|---|---|---|---|---|---|---|---|---|---|
| J. Grandjean | Middleweight | Clody (FRA); L | Pštros (TCH); L | did not advance | | | | | —N/a | =20 |
| Louis Veuve | Middleweight | Okulicz-Kozaryn (POL); L | Grbić (YUG); L | did not advance | | | | | —N/a | =20 |
