= Uruguay at the 1924 Summer Olympics =

- IOC code: URU
- NOC: Uruguayan Olympic Committee

in Paris
- Competitors: 33 in 3 sports
- Medals Ranked 19th: Gold 1 Silver 0 Bronze 0 Total 1

Summer Olympics appearances (overview)
- 1924; 1928; 1932; 1936; 1948; 1952; 1956; 1960; 1964; 1968; 1972; 1976; 1980; 1984; 1988; 1992; 1996; 2000; 2004; 2008; 2012; 2016; 2020; 2024

Uruguay competed in the Summer Olympic Games for the first time at the 1924 Summer Olympics in Paris, France.

== Medalists ==
=== Gold ===
- José Andrade, Pedro Arispe, Pedro Casella, Pedro Cea, Luis Chiappara, Pedro Etchegoyen, Alfredo Ghierra, Andrés Mazali, José Nasazzi, José Naya, Pedro Petrone, Ángel Romano, Zoilo Saldombide, Héctor Scarone, Pascual Somma, Humberto Tomassina, Antonio Urdinarán, Santos Urdinarán, Fermín Uriarte, José Vidal, Alfredo J. Zibechi, and Pedro Zingone — Football, Men's Team Competition

== Results by event ==
=== Boxing ===
Five boxers represented Uruguay at the 1924 Games. It was the nation's debut in the sport as well as the Games. Nicolares was the only Uruguayan boxer to win a bout, reaching the second round before being defeated. Smoris also reached the second round via bye before losing his first bout.

Boxer	Weight class	Round of 32	Round of 16	Quarterfinals	Semifinals	Final / Bronze match		References
Boxer	Weight class	Opposition Score	Opposition Score	Opposition Score	Opposition Score	Opposition Score	Rank	
Liberto Corney	Lightweight	Graham (CAN); L	did not advance				17	
Mario González	Bantamweight	Andrén (SWE); L	did not advance				17	
Jorge Nicolares	Lightweight	Gutmans (LAT); W	Tholey (FRA); L	did not advance			9	
Andrés Recalde	Flyweight	Lanzi (ITA); L	did not advance				17	
Manuel Smoris	Featherweight	Bye	Depont (FRA); L	did not advance			9	

Opponent nation	Wins	Losses	Percent
Canada	0	1	.000
France	0	2	.000
Italy	0	1	.000
Latvia	1	0	1.000
Sweden	0	1	.000
Total	1	5	.167

Round	Wins	Losses	Percent
Round of 32	1	3	.250
Round of 16	0	2	.000
Quarterfinals	0	0	–
Semifinals	0	0	–
Final	0	0	–
Bronze match	0	0	–
Total	1	5	.167

=== Fencing ===
Six fencers, all men, represented Uruguay in 1924. It was the nation's debut in the sport as well as the Games.

Men

Ranks given are within the pool.

Fencer	Event	Round 1		Round 2		Quarterfinals		Semifinals		Final	
Fencer	Event	Result	Rank	Result	Rank	Result	Rank	Result	Rank	Result	Rank
Héctor Belo Herrera	Épée	5–4	7	N/A		did not advance					
Héctor Belo Herrera	Sabre	N/A				4–2	1 Q	4–4	5	did not advance	
Santos Ferreira	Épée	0–8	9	N/A		did not advance					
Domingo Mendy	Épée	4–5	7	N/A		did not advance					
Domingo Mendy	Foil	1–1	2 Q	2–2	2 Q	1–4	5	did not advance			
Domingo Mendy	Sabre	N/A				2–3	4 Q	1–7	8	did not advance	
Pedro Mendy	Foil	3–1	1 Q	1–4	5	did not advance					
Pedro Mendy	Sabre	N/A				2–3	4 Q	0–8	9	did not advance	
Conrado Rolando	Épée	4–4	5 Q	N/A		4–6	8	did not advance			
Conrado Rolando	Sabre	N/A				4–2	3 Q	2–6	8	did not advance	
Gilberto Telechea	Foil	1–3	5	did not advance							
Héctor Belo Herrera; Santos Ferreira; Domingo Mendy; Conrado Rolando	Team épée	1–2	3	N/A		did not advance					
Héctor Belo Herrera; Santos Ferreira; Domingo Mendy; Pedro Mendy; Conrado Rolando	Team sabre	0–2	3	N/A		did not advance					

=== Football ===
Uruguay competed in the Olympic football tournament for the first time in 1924, winning the first of back-to-back gold medals.

Round 1

May 26, 1924

Uruguay	7–0	Yugoslavia
Vidal 20'; Scarone 23'; Cea 50' 80'; Petrone 35' 61'; Romano 58'	Report

Stade Olympique, Colombes
Attendance: 1,000
Referee: Georges Vallat (FRA)

Round 2

May 29, 1924

Uruguay	3–0	United States
Petrone 10' 44'; Scarone 15'	Report

Stade Bergeyre
Attendance: 10,455
Referee: Charles Barette (BEL)

Quarterfinals

June 1, 1924

France	1–5	Uruguay
Nicolas 12'	Report	Scarone 2' 24'; Petrone 58' 68'; Romano 83'

Stade Olympique, Colombes
Attendance: 45,000
Referee: P. Chr. Andersen (NOR)

Semifinals

June 6, 1924

Uruguay	2–1	Netherlands
Cea 62'; Scarone 81' (pen.)	Report	Pijl 32'

Stade Olympique, Colombes
Attendance: 40,000
Referee: G. Vallat (FRA)

Final

June 9, 1924

Uruguay	3–0	Switzerland
Petrone 9'; Cea 65'; Romano 82'	Report

Stade Olympique, Colombes
Attendance: 41,000
Referee: Marcel Slawik (FRA)

Final rank

Roster

- José Andrade
- Pedro Arispe
- Pedro Casella
- Pedro Cea
- Luis Chiappara
- Pedro Etchegoyen
- Alfredo Ghierra
- Andrés Mazali
- José Nasazzi
- José Naya
- Pedro Petrone
- Ángel Romano
- Zoilo Saldombide
- Héctor Scarone
- Pascual Somma
- Humberto Tomassina
- Antonio Urdinarán
- Santos Urdinarán
- Fermín Uriarte
- José Vidal
- Alfredo J. Zibechi
- Pedro Zignone
