= Football at the 1924 Summer Olympics =

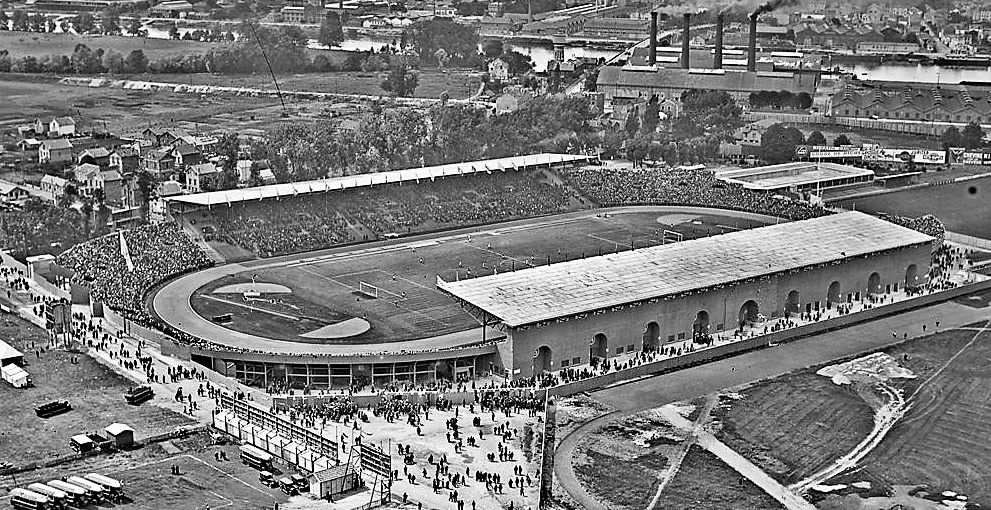
- Crowds arrive for the final, 9 June 1924

Tournament details
- Host country: France
- Dates: 25 May – 9 June 1924
- Teams: 22 (from 4 confederations)
- Venues: 4 (in 4 host cities)

Final positions
- Champions: Uruguay (1st title)
- Runners-up: Switzerland
- Third place: Sweden
- Fourth place: Netherlands

Tournament statistics
- Matches played: 24
- Goals scored: 96 (4 per match)
- Attendance: 210,424 (8,768 per match)
- Top scorer: (Uruguay) Pedro Petrone (6 goals)

Football at the 1924 Summer Olympics was the sixth edition of the football tournament at the Summer Olympic Games held in Paris. This was the first tournament where the winners would be recognized as FIFA World Champions.

The tournament expanded to 22 countries from four confederations for the first time, with African side Egypt (as was the case in the previous edition), Turkey which is partly in Asia, Uruguay representing South America and the United States representing North America.

Uruguay made a memorable debut, going undefeated and winning the gold medal.

== Venues ==
Colombes	Locations in Paris	Paris
Stade olympique	Locations in Paris	Stade Bergeyre
Capacity: 60,000	Locations in Paris	Capacity: 10,455
Vincennes	Locations in Paris	Saint-Ouen
Stade Pershing	Locations in Paris	Stade de Paris
Capacity: 8,110	Locations in Paris	Capacity: 5,145

== Amateur status ==
In 1921, the Belgium Football Association first allowed for payments to players for time lost from work; in the months that followed four other Associations (Switzerland and Italy amongst them) permitted similar subsidies. The Football Association, perhaps with foresight, considered their statement of 1884 to be one which FIFA should hereafter follow. They had stated:

Any player registered with this Association ... receiving remuneration ... of any sort above ... necessary expenses actually paid, shall be considered to be a professional.

In 1923 the four British Associations sought an assurance that FIFA accept this definition; the four FIFA representatives on the International Football Association Board refused, and, consequently, both the United Kingdom and Denmark withdrew their footballers from representing their nations at the 1924 Olympic Games.

== Entries ==
In Association Football (1960), Bernard Joy wrote about the 1912 Games that the authorities in Sweden "… had debated for a long time whether to include football ... because its popularity was not yet world wide". Twelve years later, in Paris, football had become so important to the Games that a 1/3 of the income generated came from football. In terms of international development these Games signalled the first participation in a major Championship of a team from South America, a continent which would provide the main competition to Europe from that moment on.

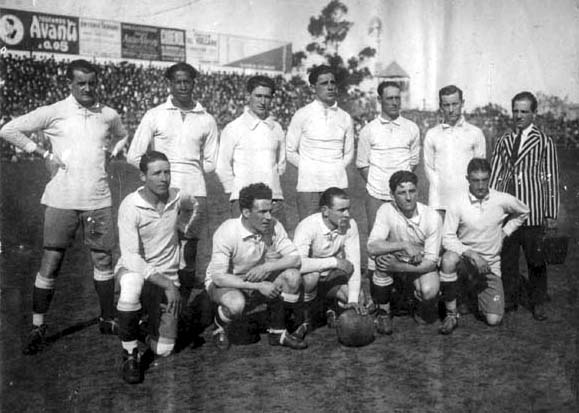
The Uruguay team had won the Sudamericano one year before the Games

In Paris, Uruguay, who had paid their third class passage to Paris and gone on a successful tour of Spain beforehand, would join as many as 18 European teams; the United States, Turkey and Egypt.

The Uruguayans had won the 1923 Sudamericano by maximum points in December of the previous year to qualify for the tournament as their continent's sole participants; defeating rivals Argentina 2–0 in the final game in which Pedro Petrone scored halfway through the first half. Joy wrote: "A doctor and a physical expert were as important elements of the staff as the coach himself. They saw to it that their charges reached perfect physical condition. They were kept that way by staying away from the attractions of Paris at a villa in the quiet village of Argenteuil". In Paris Jose Leandro Andrade would be dubbed La Merveille Noire. Despite this little was known about them; they had never played outside South America and their international experience had mainly been spent travelling across the harbour from Buenos Aires to Montevideo.

Italy, having remained unbeaten since 1922, found themselves beaten 4–0 by an early incantation of Hugo Meisl's Wunderteam (who would absent themselves from the Games). With just six weeks to go before the Games, Italy had been walloped 7–1 by Hungary. Other than dropping Giampiero Combi, Vittorio Pozzo would not make major changes; Italy would not prevail. The same policy was adopted by Kingdom of SCS. Rather than considering dropping players, they had sacked their manager Veljko Ugrinić instead (following a 4–1 defeat by those Austrians in Zagreb) but would find his replacement Todor Sekulić just as hapless.

The Hungarians had just come off a good run of results in the previous year, but had been beaten by the Swiss in the days leading up to the Games; Max Abegglen, who had only been playing international football for two years, scoring his 7th international goal that day for the Swiss. The Swiss had been on the verge of withdrawing from the Games due to their continued success. The team's train ticket was valid for only 10 days and their money had run out. An appeal by a newspaper, Sport, brought in the needed funds.

Entering for the second time Egypt caused a surprise defeat in their opening game. Both finalists from the previous Games were present;:Belgium bwasafforded a bye into the first round;, and the Czechs drawn against Turkey in the preliminary round.

== Final tournament ==
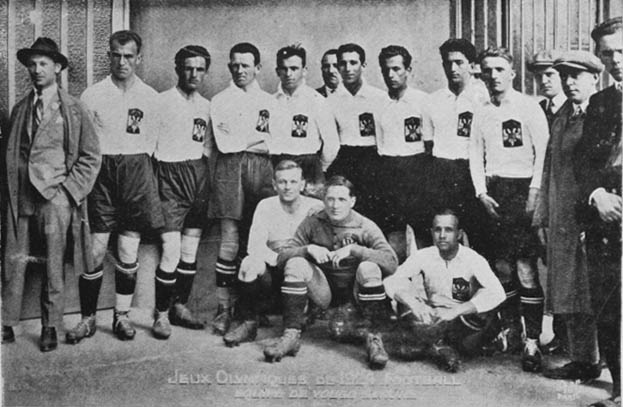
The Kingdom of SCS side had a poor showing

The Games competition was assisted by a preliminary round which featured the silver medallists from the 1920 Games, Spain in a game with Italy. Since that time Spain had only lost once, and that by a single goal away to Belgium, and had drawn 0–0 with the Italians in March 1924. There was hardly anything between them and Italy when they met, this time, at the Colombes Stadium; Pedro Vallana's own goal allowed victory for Italy.

Hungary put five past Poland, the Swiss sent Lithuania on their way, 9–0. The Uruguayans "…played first-rate football, combining speed, skill and perfect ball-control. By marrying short passing to intelligent positional play, they made the ball do all the work, and so kept their opponents on the run" wrote Joy. The Uruguayans sailed past Kingdom of SCS by seven clear goals, then overcame the United States by three goals to nil.

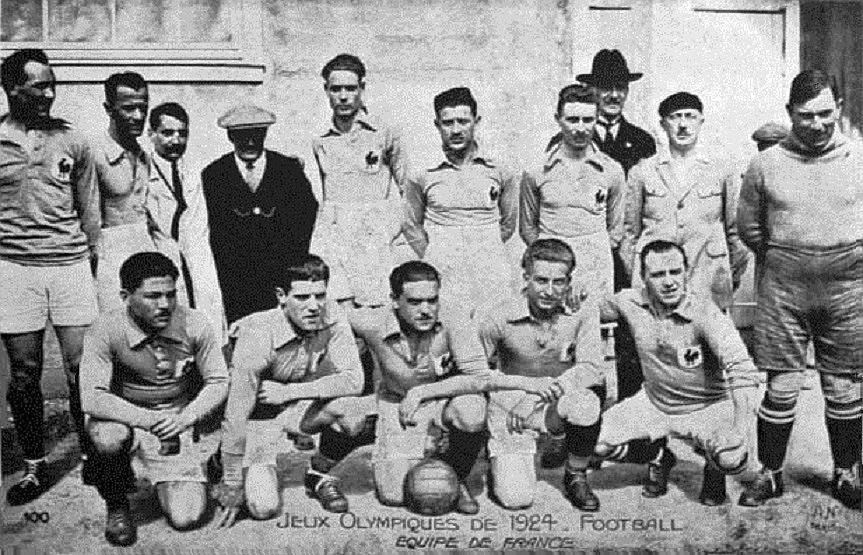
The French squad, eliminated by Uruguay

In the first round Czechoslovakia (following their decision to walk off the field in 1920) faced Switzerland and the game went into extra-time. One Czech was sent off, and the Norwegian referee had to call for order during a break. For the replay, Abegllen took the captain's duties and all was different; Switzerland winning by the single goal. Otherwise there were two surprises, the first went Egypt's way; 3–0 to the good against Hungary. The second saw Sweden defeat the reigning gold-medallists, Belgium 8–1. Oscar Verbeeck's own goal set the Swedes on their way; Sven Rydell's hat-trick the feature of the match. The Swedish outside-left Rudolf Kock (who would become chairman of the selectors in 1948 working alongside George Raynor), would have another fine game against Egypt where Sweden won 5–0. France and Holland had been similarly dominant in the first round, but Uruguay beat France 5–1 to claim a semi-final place.

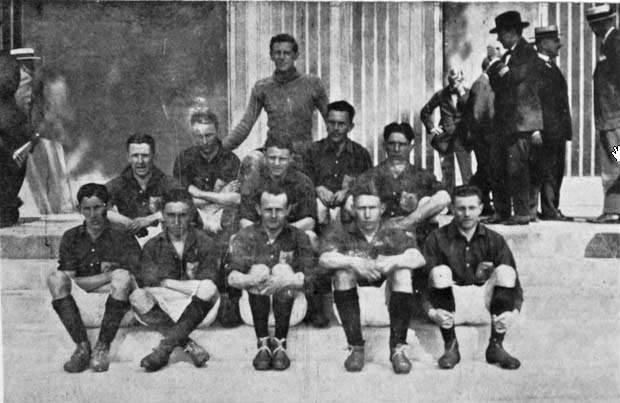
The Netherlands were defeated by Uruguay at the semifinal stage

In another quarter-final Italy went out to Switzerland disputing a winner by Max Abegglen, who converted a break-away goal. The Italians protested that he had been off-side. The referee Johannes Mutters, refused to alter the decision of his linesman; a jury upheld the judgement. There was further dispute in the semi-final where Holland (coached by the former Blackburn Rovers' player William Townley) took a first-half lead against Uruguay through Feyenoord's Kees Pijl. With twenty minutes to go, Pedro Cea scored an equaliser, and with less than ten Georges Vallat, the French referee, awarded Uruguay a penalty. FIFA reported that "…the Netherlands protested the ruling of a penalty kick that turned out to be the winning goal but then Uruguay protested against the Olympic Committee's selection of a Dutch referee for the final. To appease the South Americans, the committee pulled the name of a final referee out of a hat and picked out a Frenchman, Marcel Slawick". In the other semi-final between Switzerland and Sweden, the Swiss prevailed.

In the final the Swiss were defeated by the Uruguayans, whose two goals in the second half put paid to their opponent's ambitions, Uruguay eventually prevailing 3–0. Interest in the final had been considerable, such was the draw of the Uruguayan side; 60,000 watched, and 10,000 were locked out.

== Bracket ==
First round
26 May – Colombes
Uruguay	7
Yugoslavia	0
25 May – Vincennes
United States	1
Estonia	0
25 May – Vincennes
Switzerland	9
Lithuania	0
25 May – Paris
Czechoslovakia	5
Turkey	2
25 May – Colombes
Italy	1
Spain	0
26 May – Paris
Hungary	5
Poland	0

Second round
29 May – Paris
Uruguay	3
United States	0
27 May – Saint-Ouen
France	7
Latvia	0
27 May – Colombes
Netherlands	6
Romania	0
28 May – Colombes
(Republic of Ireland) Irish Free State	1
Bulgaria	0
28 and 30 May – Paris
Switzerland (replay)	1 (1)
Czechoslovakia	1 (0)
29 May – Vincennes
Italy	2
Luxembourg	0
29 May – Colombes
Sweden	8
Belgium	1
29 May – Saint-Ouen
Egypt	3
Hungary	0

Quarter-finals
1 June – Colombes
Uruguay	5
France	1
2 June – Saint-Ouen
Netherlands	2
(Republic of Ireland) Irish Free State	1
2 June – Paris
Switzerland	2
Italy	1
1 June – Vincennes
Sweden	5
Egypt	0

Semi-finals
6 June – Colombes
Uruguay	2
Netherlands	1
5 June – Colombes
Switzerland	2
Sweden	1

Final
9 June – Colombes
Uruguay	3
Switzerland	0
Third place
8 and 9 June – Colombes
Sweden (replay)	1 (3)
Netherlands	1 (1)

== Match details ==
=== First round ===
25 May 1924
15:30

Italy	1–0	Spain
Vallana 84' (o.g.)	Report

Stade olympique, Colombes
Attendance: 18,991
Referee: Marcel Slawik (FRA)

25 May 1924
15:30

Czechoslovakia	5–2	Turkey
R. Sloup 21'; Sedláček 28', 37'; Ja. Novák 64'; Čapek 74'	Report	Refet 63', 82'

Stade Bergeyre, Paris
Attendance: 4,344
Referee: P. Chr. Andersen (NOR)

25 May 1924
15:30

Switzerland	9–0	Lithuania
Sturzenegger 2', 43', 68', 85'; Dietrich 14'; Abegglen 41', 50', 58'; Ramseyer 63' (pen.)	Report

Stade Pershing, Vincennes
Attendance: 8,110
Referee: Antonio Scamoni (ITA)

25 May 1924
17:15

United States	1–0	Estonia
Straden 15' (pen.)	Report

Stade Pershing, Vincennes
Attendance: 8,110
Referee: Paul Putz (BEL)

26 May 1924
16:00

Uruguay	7–0	Kingdom of SCS
Vidal 20'; Scarone 23'; Cea 50', 80'; Petrone 35', 61'; Romano 58'	Report

Stade olympique, Colombes
Attendance: 3,025
Referee: Georges Vallat (FRA)

26 May 1924
17:00

Hungary	5–0	Poland
Eisenhoffer 14'; Hirzer 51', 58'; Opata 70', 87'	Report

Stade Bergeyre, Paris
Attendance: 3,578
Referee: Johannes Mutters (NED)

=== Second round ===
27 May 1924
17:00

France	7–0	Latvia
Crut 17', 28', 55'; Nicolas 25', 50'; Boyer 71', 87'	Report

Stade de Paris, Saint-Ouen
Attendance: 5,145
Referee: Henri Christophe (BEL)

27 May 1924
16:00

Netherlands	6–0	Romania
Hurgronje 8'; Pijl 32', 52', 66', 68'; De Natris 69' (pen.)	Report

Stade olympique, Colombes
Attendance: 1,840
Referee: Felix Herren (SUI)

28 May 1924
17:00

Switzerland	1–1 (a.e.t.)	Czechoslovakia
Dietrich 79'	Report	R. Sloup 21' (pen.)

Stade Bergeyre, Paris
Attendance: 9,157
Referee: P. Chr. Andersen (NOR)
30 May 1924
17:00

Switzerland	1–0	Czechoslovakia
Pache 87'	Report

Stade Bergeyre, Paris
Attendance: 5,673
Referee: Marcel Slawik (FRA)

28 May 1924
16:00

Ireland (FAIFS)	1–0	Bulgaria
Duncan 75'	Report

Stade olympique, Colombes
Attendance: 1,659
Referee: Henri Henriot (FRA)

29 May 1924
14:15

Italy	2–0	Luxembourg
Baloncieri 20'; Della Valle 38'	Report

Stade Pershing, Vincennes
Attendance: 4,254
Referee: Olivier De Ricard (FRA)

29 May 1924
16:00

Sweden	8–1	Belgium
Kock 8', 24', 77'; Rydell 20', 61', 83'; Brommesson 30'; Keller 46'	Report	Larnoe 67'

Stade olympique, Colombes
Attendance: 8,532
Referee: Heinrich Retschury (AUT)

29 May 1924
17:00

Egypt	3–0	Hungary
Yakan 4', 58'; Hegazi 40'	Report

Stade de Paris, Saint-Ouen
Attendance: 4,371
Referee: Luis Colina (ESP)

29 May 1924
17:00

Uruguay	3–0	United States
Petrone 10', 44'; Scarone 15'	Report

Stade Bergeyre, Paris
Attendance: 10,455
Referee: Charles Barette (BEL)

=== Quarter-finals ===
1 June 1924
16:00

France	1–5	Uruguay
Nicolas 12'	Report	Scarone 2', 24'; Petrone 58', 68'; Romano 83'

Stade olympique, Colombes
Attendance: 30,868
Referee: P. Chr. Andersen (NOR)

1 June 1924
16:00

Sweden	5–0	Egypt
Kaufeldt 5', 71'; Brommesson 31', 34'; Rydell 49'	Report

Stade Pershing, Vincennes
Attendance: 6,484
Referee: Henri Christophe (BEL)

2 June 1924
17:00

Switzerland	2–1	Italy
Sturzenegger 47'; Abegglen 60'	Report	Della Valle 52'

Stade Bergeyre, Paris
Attendance: 8,359
Referee: Johannes Mutters (NED)

2 June 1924
17:00

Netherlands	2–1 (a.e.t.)	Ireland (FAIFS)
Formenoij 7', 104'	Report	Ghent 33'

Stade de Paris, Saint-Ouen
Attendance: 1,506
Referee: Heinrich Retschury (AUT)

=== Semi-finals ===
5 June 1924
17:00

Switzerland	2–1	Sweden
Abegglen 15', 77'	Report	Kock 41'

Stade olympique, Colombes
Attendance: 7,448
Referee: Mihaly Ivancsics (HUN)

6 June 1924
17:00

Uruguay	2–1	Netherlands
Cea 62'; Scarone 81' (pen.)	Report	Pijl 32'

Stade olympique, Colombes
Attendance: 7,088
Referee: Georges Vallat (FRA)

=== Bronze medal match ===
8 June 1924
16:00

Sweden	1–1	Netherlands
Kaufeldt 44'	Report	Le Fèvre 77'

Stade olympique, Colombes
Attendance: 9,915
Referee: Heinrich Retschury (AUT)

9 June 1924
14:30

Sweden	3–1	Netherlands
Rydell 34', 77'; Lundqvist 42'	Report	Formenoij 43' (pen.)

Stade olympique, Colombes
Attendance: 40,522
Referee: Youssuf Mohamed (EGY)

=== Gold medal match ===
9 June 1924
16:30

Uruguay	3–0	Switzerland
Petrone 9'; Cea 65'; Romano 82'	Report

Stade olympique, Colombes
Attendance: 40,522
Referee: Marcel Slawik (France)

Team details

Uruguay

GK	Andrés Mazali
DF	José Nasazzi
DF	Pedro Arispe
MF	José Leandro Andrade
MF	José Vidal
MF	Alfredo Ghierra
FW	Santos Urdinarán
FW	Hector Scarone
FW	Pedro Petrone
FW	Pedro Cea
FW	Angel Romano
Manager:
(Uruguay) Ernesto Figoli

Switzerland

GK	Hans Pulver
DF	Adolphe Reymond
DF	Rudolf Ramseyer
MF	August Oberhauser
MF	Paul Schmiedlin
MF	Aron Pollitz
FW	Karl Ehrenbolger
FW	Robert Pache
FW	Walter Dietrich
FW	Max Abegglen
FW	Paul Fässler
Manager:
(England) Thomas Duckworth

== Final ranking ==
As per statistical convention in football, matches decided in extra time are counted as wins and losses, while matches decided by penalty shoot-outs are counted as draws.

Pos	Team	Pld	W	D	L	GF	GA	GD	Pts	Result
1st place, gold medalist(s)	Uruguay	5	5	0	0	20	2	+18	10	
2nd place, silver medalist(s)	Switzerland	6	4	1	1	15	6	+9	9	
3rd place, bronze medalist(s)	Sweden	5	3	1	1	18	5	+13	7	
4	Netherlands	5	2	1	2	11	7	+4	5	
5	Italy	3	2	0	1	4	2	+2	4	Eliminated in quarter-final
6	France	2	1	0	1	8	5	+3	2	Eliminated in quarter-final
7	Ireland	2	1	0	1	2	2	0	2	Eliminated in quarter-final
8	Egypt	2	1	0	1	3	5	−2	2	Eliminated in quarter-final
9	Czechoslovakia	3	1	1	1	6	4	+2	3	Eliminated in second round
10	Hungary	2	1	0	1	5	3	+2	2	Eliminated in second round
11	United States	2	1	0	1	1	3	−2	2	Eliminated in second round
12	Bulgaria	1	0	0	1	0	1	−1	0	Eliminated in second round
13	Luxembourg	1	0	0	1	0	2	−2	0	Eliminated in second round
14	Romania	1	0	0	1	0	6	−6	0	Eliminated in second round
15	Latvia	1	0	0	1	0	7	−7	0	Eliminated in second round
16	Belgium	1	0	0	1	1	8	−7	0	Eliminated in second round
17	Spain	1	0	0	1	0	1	−1	0	Eliminated in first round
18	Estonia	1	0	0	1	0	1	−1	0	Eliminated in first round
19	Turkey	1	0	0	1	2	5	−3	0	Eliminated in first round
20	Poland	1	0	0	1	0	5	−5	0	Eliminated in first round
21	Kingdom of SCS	1	0	0	1	0	7	−7	0	Eliminated in first round
22	Lithuania	1	0	0	1	0	9	−9	0	Eliminated in first round

== Medalists ==
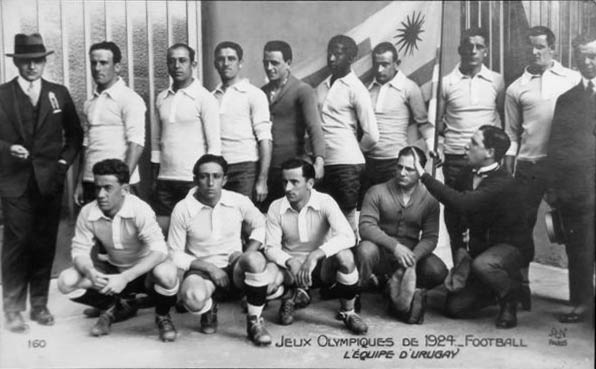
The Uruguayan team that won its first Gold Medal

Gold	Silver	Bronze
Uruguay José Leandro Andrade; Pedro Arispe; Pedro Casella; Pedro Cea; Luis Chiappara; Pedro Etchegoyen; Alfredo Ghierra; Andrés Mazali; José Nasazzi; José Naya; Pedro Petrone; Ángel Romano; Zoilo Saldombide; Héctor Scarone; Pascual Somma; Humberto Tomasina; Antonio Urdinarán; Santos Urdinarán; Fermín Uriarte; José Vidal; Alfredo Zibechi; Pedro Zingone	Switzerland Max Abegglen; Félix Bédouret; Charles Bouvier; Walter Dietrich; Karl Ehrenbolger; Paul Fässler; Gustav Gottenkieny; Jean Haag; Marcel Katz; Edmond Kramer; Adolphe Mengotti; August Oberhauser; Robert Pache; Aron Pollitz; Hans Pulver; Rudolf Ramseyer; Adolphe Reymond; Louis Richard; Teo Schär; Paul Schmiedlin; Paul Sturzenegger; Walter Weiler	Sweden Axel Alfredsson; Charles Brommesson; Gustaf Carlsson; Albin Dahl; Sven Friberg; Karl Gustafsson; Fritjof Hillén; Konrad Hirsch; Gunnar Holmberg; Per Kaufeldt; Tore Keller; Rudolf Kock; Sigfrid Lindberg; Vigor Lindberg; Sven Lindqvist; Evert Lundqvist; Sten Mellgren; Gunnar Olsson; Sven Rydell; Harry Sundberg; Thorsten Svensson; Robert Zander

== Goalscorers ==
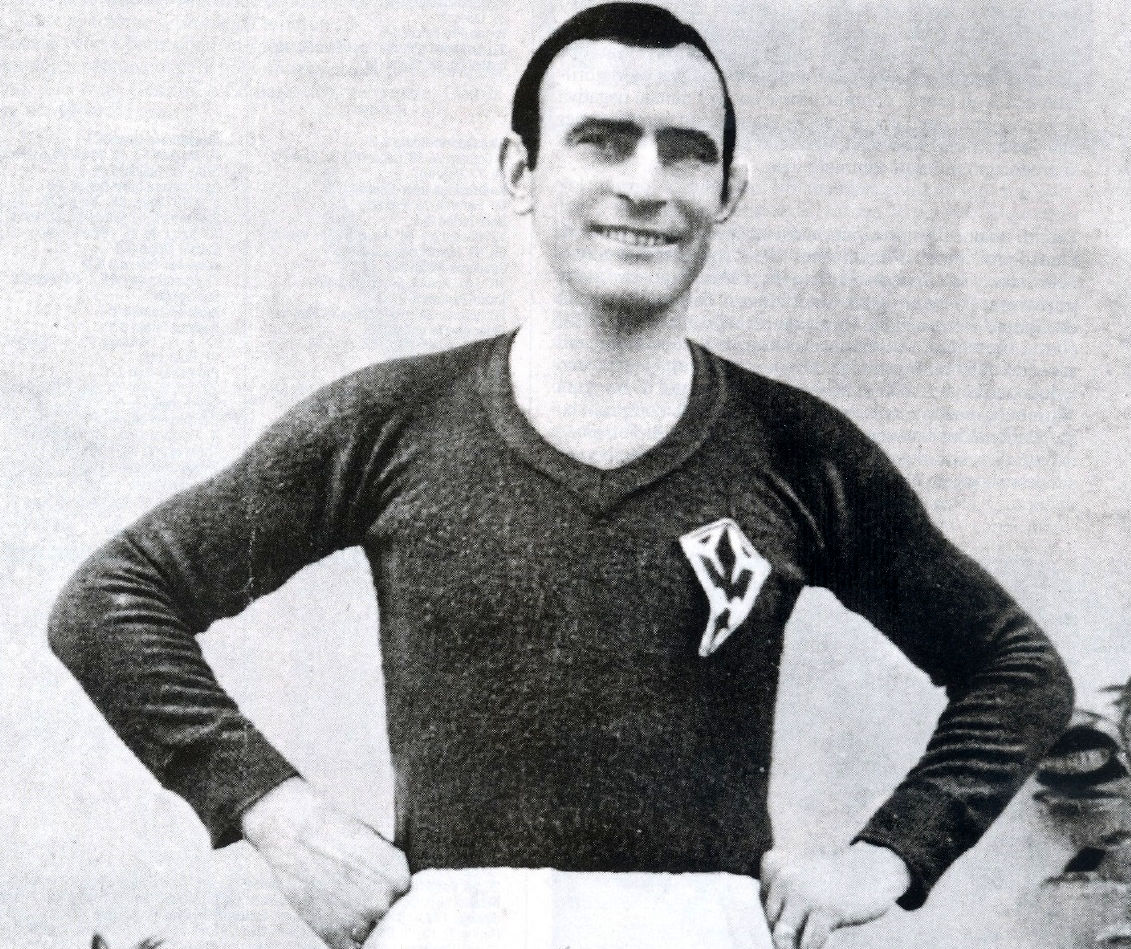
Uruguayan Pedro Petrone, topscorer with 7 goals

7 goals

- Pedro Petrone (Uruguay)

6 goals

- Max Abegglen (Switzerland)

5 goals

- Kees Pijl (Netherlands)
- Sven Rydell (Sweden)
- Paul Sturzenegger (Switzerland)
- Héctor Scarone (Uruguay)

4 goals

- Pedro Cea (Uruguay)
- Putte Kock (Sweden)

3 goals

- Édouard Crut (France)
- Paul Nicolas (France)
- Ok Formenoij (Netherlands)
- Charles Brommesson (Sweden)
- Per Kaufeldt (Sweden)
- Ángel Romano (Uruguay)

2 goals

- (Czech Republic) Josef Sedláček (Czechoslovakia)
- (Czech Republic) Rudolf Sloup (Czechoslovakia)
- Ibrahim Yakan (Egypt)
- Jean Boyer (France)
- Giuseppe Della Valle (Italy)
- Walter Dietrich (Switzerland)
- Bekir Refet (Turkey)
- Ferenc Hirzer (Hungary)
- Zoltán Opata (Hungary)

1 goal

- Henri Larnoe (Belgium)
- (Czech Republic) Josef Čapek (Czechoslovakia)
- (Czech Republic) Jan Novák (Czechoslovakia)
- Hussein Hegazi (Egypt)
- József Eisenhoffer (Hungary)
- (Republic of Ireland) Paddy Duncan (Ireland)
- (Republic of Ireland) Frank Ghent (Ireland)
- Adolfo Baloncieri (Italy)
- André le Fèvre (Netherlands)
- Albert Hurgronje (Netherlands)
- Jan de Natris (Netherlands)
- Tore Keller (Sweden)
- Evert Lundqvist (Sweden)
- Robert Pache (Switzerland)
- Rudolf Ramseyer (Switzerland)
- Andy Straden (United States)
- José Vidal (Uruguay)

Own goals

- Pedro Vallana (Spain; playing against Italy)
