= Armand Boppart =

Swiss water polo player

Personal information
- Nationality: Swiss
- Born: 7 April 1894
- Died: 9 April 1975 (aged 81)

Sport
- Sport: Water polo

Armand Boppart (7 April 1894 – 9 April 1975) was a Swiss water polo player. He competed in the men's tournament at the 1920 Summer Olympics.
