= Fernand Moret =

Swiss water polo player

Personal information
- Nationality: Swiss
- Born: 15 January 1905
- Died: 1982 (aged 76–77)

Sport
- Sport: Water polo

Fernand Moret (15 January 1905 – 1982) was a Swiss water polo player. He competed at the 1924 Summer Olympics and the 1928 Summer Olympics.
