= André le Fèvre =

Dutch footballer

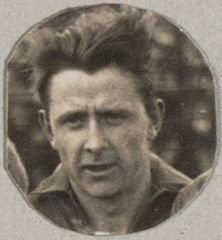
- André le Fèvre in 1924

Personal information
- Full name: André Jarich le Fèvre
- Date of birth: 12 December 1898 in
- Place of birth: Arnhem, the Netherlands
- Date of death: 6 November 1977 (aged 78)
- Place of death: The Hague, the Netherlands

Senior career*
Years	Team	Apps	(Gls)
- Hercules
1917–1921	Theole		
1921–1925	SV Kampong		

International career
1922–1925	Netherlands	17	(1)
- * Club domestic league appearances and goals

André Jarich le Fèvre (12 December 1898 – 6 November 1977) was a Dutch association football midfielder. He was included in the Netherlands team that finished fourth for the 1924 Summer Olympics; le Fèvre played five games and scored one goal. That goal was a 77-minute equalizer in the bronze medal match between Sweden and the Netherlands. The match ended in a 1:1 draw, but the Netherlands team lost the replay match 1:3 on the next day. He totalled 17 international appearances, scoring once.

He won the Eerste Klasse title with Theole in 1920 and between 1921 and 1925 le Fèvre played for SV Kampong. In 1925 he moved to Curaçao and ended his football career.
