= Sven Lindqvist (footballer) =

Swedish footballer

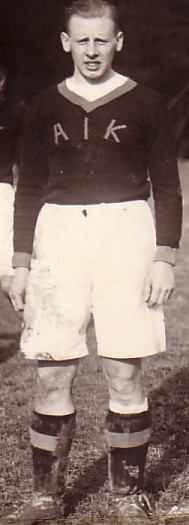

Personal information
- Born: 26 March 1903 Stockholm, Sweden
- Died: 25 January 1987 (aged 83) Stockholm, Sweden

Sport
- Sport: Football
- Club: AIK
Medal record
Representing Sweden
Olympic Games
Bronze medal – third place	1924 Paris	Team

Sven Bernhard Lindqvist (26 March 1903 – 25 January 1987) was a Swedish association football player who won a bronze medal at the 1924 Summer Olympics. During his career with AIK he played 137 matches and scored 4 goals, winning the national title in 1923. In 1950–61 he served as General Manager of the club.
