= Ok Formenoij =

Dutch footballer

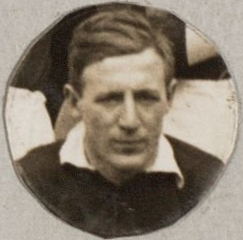
- Formenoij in 1924

Personal information
- Full name: Ocker Nicolaus Formenoij
- Date of birth: 16 March 1899
- Place of birth: Rotterdam, the Netherlands
- Date of death: 14 February 1977 (aged 77)
- Place of death: Rotterdam, the Netherlands
- Position: Forward

Youth career
- SIOD

Senior career*
Years	Team	Apps	(Gls)
1920–1922	Feijenoord	44	(30)
1922–1933	Sparta		

International career
1924–1931	Netherlands	4	(4)

Managerial career
- 1935-1935: Willem II
- 1943-1946: Unitas
- * Club domestic league appearances and goals

Ocker Nicolaus "Ok" Formenoij (16 March 1899 – 14 February 1977, also written Formenoy) was a Dutch association football player. He was part of the Dutch team that finished fourth at the 1924 Summer Olympics; Formenoij played three last games and scored three goals.

In the quarter-final match against Ireland, Formenoij scored at seventh minute, Ireland equalized, and Formenoij scored again in extra time, bringing the Dutch team to the bronze medal match against Sweden. The match ended in a 1–1 draw, and a replay was set up on the next day. The Netherlands lost 1–3 with Formenoij scoring its only goal.

Formenoy started playing football at SIOD before moving to Feijenoord in 1920. He later joined Sparta in controversial circumstances.
