= Fermín Uriarte =

Uruguayan footballer (1902–1972)

Personal information
- Date of birth: 1902
- Date of death: 18 December 1972 (aged 69–70)
- Position: Defender

Senior career*
Years	Team	Apps	(Gls)
- Lito

International career
1923–1925	Uruguay	13	(0)
Medal record
Men's football
Representing Uruguay
Olympic Games
Gold medal – first place	1924 Paris	Team
South American Championship
Winner	1923 Uruguay
Winner	1924 Uruguay
- * Club domestic league appearances and goals

Fermín Uriarte (1902 – 18 December 1972) was a Uruguayan footballer. He was member of Uruguay squad which won gold medal at 1924 Olympics, but he did not play in any matches. He was also part of national team which won South American Championship in 1923 and 1924.
