= José Naya =

Uruguayan football player (1896–1977)

Personal information
- Date of birth: 25 July 1896
- Date of death: 29 January 1977 (aged 80)
- Position: Forward

Senior career*
Years	Team	Apps	(Gls)
- Liverpool Montevideo

International career
1924	Uruguay	2	(0)
Medal record
Men's football
Representing Uruguay
Olympic Games
Gold medal – first place	1924 Paris	Team
- * Club domestic league appearances and goals

José Naya (25 July 1896 – 29 January 1977) was a Uruguayan footballer who played as a forward. He was part of the Uruguayan team which won a gold medal at the 1924 Olympics.
