= Aron Pollitz =

Swiss footballer (1896-1977)

Personal information
- Date of birth: 11 February 1896
- Place of birth: Basel, Switzerland
- Date of death: 13 November 1977 (aged 81)
- Place of death: Switzerland
- Position: Defender

Senior career*
Years	Team	Apps	(Gls)
1915–1924	BSC Old Boys		
1924–1927	US Suisse Paris		
1927–1928	BSC Old Boys		

International career
1920–1925	Switzerland	23	(0)
Medal record
Silver medal – second place	1924 Paris	Team competition
- * Club domestic league appearances and goals

Aron Pollitz (11 February 1896 – 13 November 1977) was a Swiss football (soccer) player who competed in the 1924 Summer Olympics.

== Career ==
After playing for BSC Old Boys from 1915 to 1924, Pollitz went to France to play for US Suisse Paris. On 13 March 1927, Pollitz accidentally kicked the Stade Olympique de l'Est goalkeeper Georges Le Bidois, aged 26, at his carotid, the incident led to the goalkeeper's sudden death. Consequently, Pollitz left France back to his former club where he played for one year before retirement.

Pollitz had 23 caps with Switzerland from 1920 to 1925. He won the silver medal in Football at the 1924 Summer Olympics in Paris, in which he took part in all games of his team during the tournament.
