= Humberto Tomasina =

Uruguayan footballer (1898-1981)

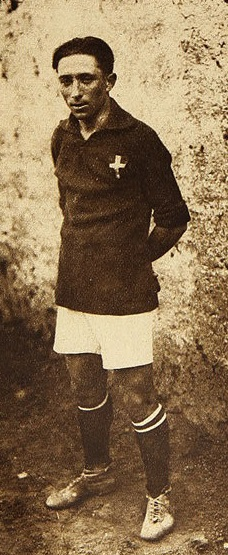
- Los Sports 1926

Personal information
- Date of birth: 12 September 1898
- Date of death: 12 June 1981 (aged 82)

Senior career*
Years	Team	Apps	(Gls)
- Liverpool Montevideo

International career
1924	Uruguay	3	(0)
Medal record
Men's football
Representing Uruguay
Olympic Games
Gold medal – first place	1924 Paris	Team
South American Championship
Winner	1923 Uruguay
- * Club domestic league appearances and goals

Humberto Tomassina (12 September 1898 – 12 June 1981) was a Uruguayan footballer.

He was a member of Uruguay squad which won gold medal at 1924 Olympics. He was also part of national team which won 1923 South American Championship at home soil, even though he didn't play any match in the tournament. He played club football for Liverpool Montevideo. In 1925, also played a match for Nacional.
