= Paul Fässler =

Swiss footballer (1901-1983)

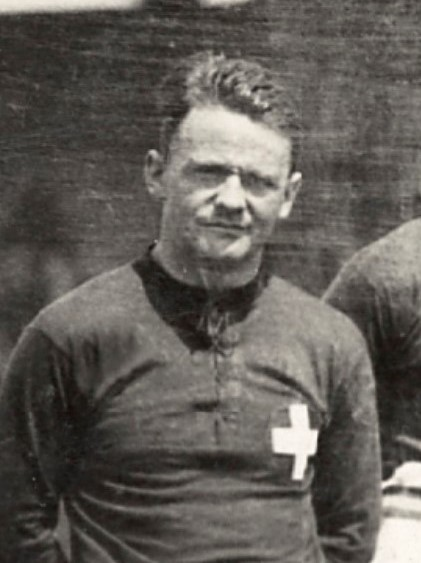
- Paul Fässler in 1928

Personal information
- Born: 13 June 1901
- Died: 26 March 1983 (aged 81)
Medal record
Men's Football
Representing Switzerland
Olympic Games
Silver medal – second place	1924 Paris	Team competition

Paul Fässler (13 June 1901 – 26 March 1983) was a Swiss association football player who competed in the 1924 Summer Olympics. He was a member of the Swiss team, which won the silver medal in the football tournament.
