= Paul Sturzenegger =

Swiss footballer (1902-1970)

Personal information
- Date of birth: 7 June 1902
- Place of birth: Rosario, Argentina
- Date of death: 19 May 1970 (aged 67)
- Place of death: Lugano, Switzerland
- Position: Forward

Senior career*
| Years | Team | Apps | (Gls) |
| 1921–1924 | Zürich | | |
| 1924–1931 | Lugano | | |

International career
| 1922–1930 | Switzerland | 15 | (10) |
- * Club domestic league appearances and goals

Olympic medal record

Men's Football
| Silver medal – second place | 1924 Paris | Team competition |

Paul (Paolo) Sturzenegger (7 June 1902 – 19 May 1970) was a Swiss association football player who competed in the 1924 Summer Olympics. He was a member of the Swiss team, which won the silver medal in the football tournament. He scored five goals in the tournament.
