= Alfredo Zibechi =

Uruguayan footballer (1894-1958)

Personal information
- Full name: Juan Alfredo Zibechi Rossi
- Date of birth: 30 October 1894
- Date of death: 19 June 1958 (aged 63)
- Position: Defender

Senior career*
Years	Team	Apps	(Gls)
- Montevideo Wanderers
- Nacional

International career
1915–1924	Uruguay	38	(1)
Medal record
Men's football
Representing Uruguay
Olympic Games
Gold medal – first place	1924 Paris	Team competition
South American Championship
Winner	1916 Argentina	Team
Winner	1920 Chile	Team
Winner	1924 Uruguay	Team
Runner-up	1919 Brazil	Team
Third place	1921 Argentina	Team
Third place	1922 Brazil	Team
- * Club domestic league appearances and goals

Juan Alfredo Zibechi Rossi (30 October 1894 – 19 June 1958) was a Uruguayan footballer who played for the Uruguay national team between 1915 and 1924. Zibechi was part of 6 Copa América squads, and was involved in three triumphs in the competition (1916, 1920 & 1924). He was also a member of the Uruguayan squad which won the gold medal in the 1924 Olympics. Zibechi started playing club football for Montevideo Wanderers and in 1919 or 1920 moved to Nacional.

== Honours ==
Uruguay

- South American Championship: 1916, 1920, 1924
- Summer Olympics: 1924
