= Pedro Casella =

Uruguayan footballer (1898-1971)

Personal information
- Date of birth: 31 October 1898
- Place of birth: Montevideo, Uruguay
- Date of death: 18 June 1971 (aged 72)
- Position: Goalkeeper

International career
Years	Team	Apps	(Gls)
1921–1923	Uruguay	7	(0)
Medal record
Men's football
Representing Uruguay
Olympic Games
Gold medal – first place	1924 Paris	Team
South American Championship
Winner	1923 Uruguay
Winner	1924 Uruguay
Third place	1921 Argentina

Pedro Casella (31 October 1898 – 18 June 1971) was a Uruguayan footballer who played as a goalkeeper. He played all three matches for Uruguay at 1923 South American Championship. He was part of national team squads which defended South American Championship title in 1924 and won gold medal at 1924 Olympics, but didn't play any matches in both tournaments as Andrés Mazali was preferred as the starting goalkeeper.

== Career statistics ==
=== International ===
National team	Year	Apps	Goals
Uruguay	1921	1	0
Uruguay	1922	0	0
Uruguay	1923	6	0
Total		7	0
