= Karl Ehrenbolger =

Swiss footballer (born 1899)

Personal information
- Born: 13 November 1899
- Died: 13 September 1993 (aged 93)
Medal record
Men's Football
Representing Switzerland
Olympic Games
Silver medal – second place	1924 Paris	Team competition

Karl Ehrenbolger (13 November 1899 – 13 September 1993) was a Swiss football player who competed in the 1924 Summer Olympics. He was a member of the Swiss team, which won the silver medal in the football tournament.
