= Stade Bergeyre =

Former sports stadium in northeastern Paris, France

Coordinates: 48°52′38″N 2°22′37″E

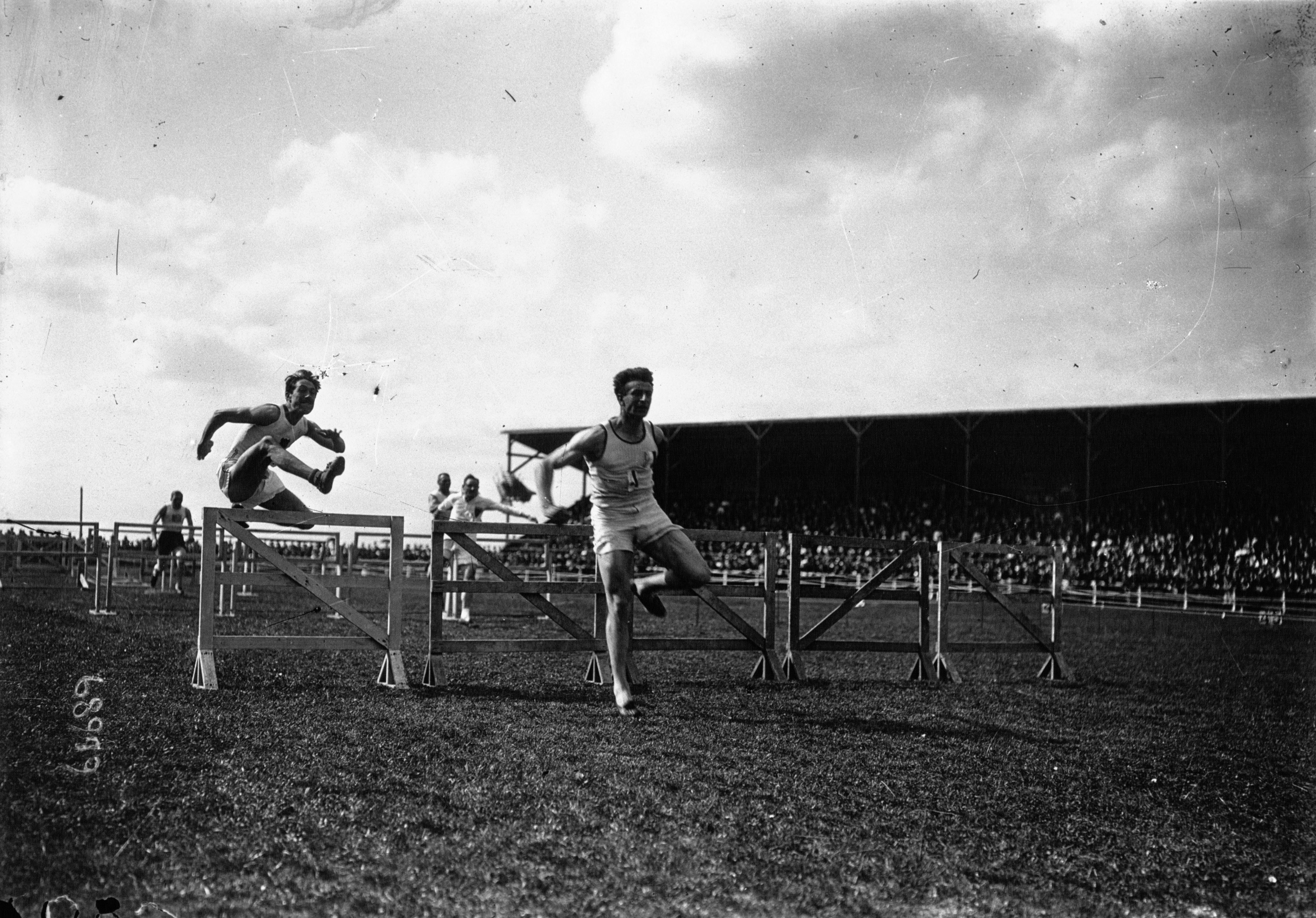
- Interactive map of the Stade Bergeyre area

General information
- Location: 19th arrondissement of Paris, Paris, France
- Completed: 1918; 108 years ago
- Demolished: 1926; 100 years ago

Stade Bergeyre was a former sports stadium in northeast of Paris, France, located in 19th district of the French capital. Built in August 1918, with financial support of Jacques Sigrand. Its capacity was approximately 15,000, and it was named after Robert Bergeyre, a young French rugby player who died at the age of 20 in World War I.

Bergeyre Stadium was mainly used for football games, and was home of the Olympique Paris team. Also, rugby, track and field and various other activities (e.g. circus) took place there. In 1924, several football and rugby games of the Olympic Games took place here. However, just two years later, it was demolished because the city of Paris, which was quickly growing, needed space for housing. The neighbourhood retained the Bergeyre name, known today as Butte Bergeyre.
