= Kees Pijl =

Dutch footballer and manager

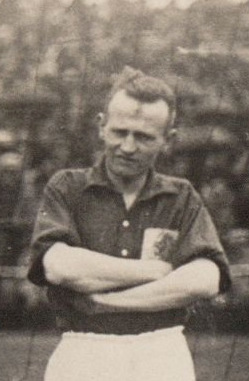
- Pijl (1924)

Personal information
- Full name: Cornelis Alidanis Pijl
- Date of birth: 9 June 1897
- Place of birth: Oosterhout, Netherlands
- Date of death: 3 September 1976 (aged 79)
- Place of death: Rotterdam, Netherlands
- Position: Striker

Youth career
- Feyenoord

Senior career*
Years	Team	Apps	(Gls)
1921–1931	Feyenoord	203	(179)

International career
1924–1926	Netherlands	8	(7)

Managerial career
- 1942–1946: Feyenoord
- * Club domestic league appearances and goals

Cornelis "Kees" Alidanis Pijl (9 June 1897 – 3 September 1976) was a Dutch footballer who was active as a striker. Pijl played his whole career at Feyenoord and won eight caps for the Netherlands, scoring seven times, of which four against Romania at the 1924 Summer Olympics. After his career he managed Feyenoord from 1942 to 1946,

== Honours ==
- 1923-24 : Eredivisie winner with Feyenoord
- 1927-28 : Eredivisie winner with Feyenoord
- 1929-30 : KNVB Cup winner with Feyenoord
