= Zoilo Saldombide =

Uruguayan footballer (1903/05–1981)

Personal information
- Full name: Lucas Zoilo Saldombide Astol
- Date of birth: October 26, 1903
- Place of birth: Santa Lucía, Uruguay
- Date of death: December 4, 1981 (aged 78)
- Position: Striker

Senior career*
| Years | Team | Apps | (Gls) |
| 1923–1926 | Montevideo Wanderers | | |
| 1927–1934 | Nacional | 182 | (45) |

International career
| 1922–1928 | Uruguay | 13 | (3) |
Medal record
Men's football
Representing Uruguay
Olympic Games
| Gold medal – first place | 1924 Paris | Team |
FIFA World Cup
| Winner | 1930 Uruguay |
South American Championship
| Winner | 1924 Uruguay |
| Winner | 1926 Chile |
- * Club domestic league appearances and goals

Lucas Zoilo Saldombide Astol (October 26, 1903 (March 18, 1905 according to other sources) - December 4, 1981) was a Uruguayan footballer. He was part of the team that won the first ever World Cup in 1930 for Uruguay, but he did not play any matches in the tournament. He was a club player of Montevideo Wanderers and Nacional.
