= Santos Urdinarán =

Uruguayan footballer (1900-1979)

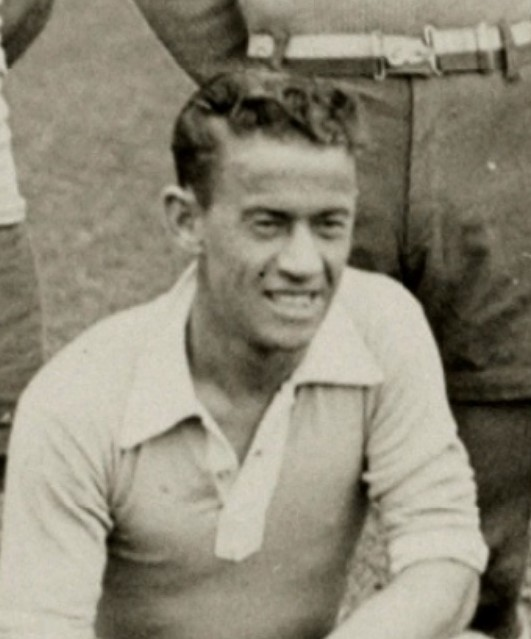
- Santos Urdinarán in 1928

Personal information
- Full name: Santos Urdinarán Barrena
- Date of birth: 30 March 1900
- Place of birth: Montevideo, Uruguay
- Date of death: 14 July 1979 (aged 79)
- Place of death: Montevideo, Uruguay
- Height: 1.70 m (5 ft 7 in)
- Position: Forward

Senior career*
Years	Team	Apps	(Gls)
1919–1933	Nacional	318	(124)

International career
1923–1930	Uruguay	20	(2)
Medal record
Men's football
Representing Uruguay
Olympic Games
Gold medal – first place	1924 Paris	Team
Gold medal – first place	1928 Amsterdam	Team
FIFA World Cup
Winner	1930 Uruguay
South American Championship
Winner	1923 Uruguay
Winner	1924 Uruguay
Winner	1926 Chile
- * Club domestic league appearances and goals

Santos "Vasquito" Urdinarán Barrena (30 March 1900 – 14 July 1979), known as El Vasquito, was a footballer from Uruguay who played as a forward. He played for Nacional from 1919 to 1933 (318 matches and 124 goals), playing the position of right winger. He was born and died in Montevideo.

He also played 20 matches and scored 2 goals for the Uruguay national football team. With the national team, he won the 1930 FIFA World Cup (without playing the final), two Olympic titles (1924 and 1928), and three Copa Americas (in 1923, 1924 and 1926).

== Honours ==
Nacional

- Primera División (6): 1919, 1920, 1922, 1923, 1924, 1933
- Copa Competencia (3): 1919, 1921, 1923

Uruguay

- FIFA World Cup: 1930
- South American Championship: 1923, 1924, 1926
- Summer Olympics: 1924, 1928

World Cup-winners status
Preceded by Domingo Tejera	Oldest Living Player; 30 June 1969 – 14 July 1979	Succeeded by Luis Monti
