= José Vidal (Uruguayan footballer) =

Uruguayan footballer (1896-1974)

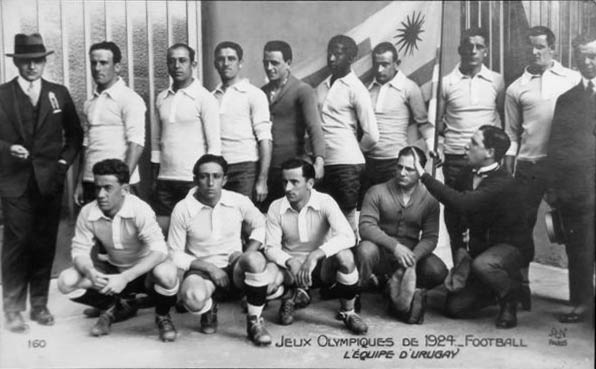
- Vidal (7th standing) and the Uruguayan team before the game won 7-0 over Yugoslavia in 1924.

Personal information
- Date of birth: 15 December 1896
- Place of birth: Montevideo, Uruguay
- Date of death: 3 July 1974 (aged 77)
- Place of death: Montevideo, Uruguay

Senior career*
Years	Team	Apps	(Gls)
- Belgrano Montevideo

International career
1923–1924	Uruguay	7	(1)
Medal record
Men's football
Representing Uruguay
Olympic Games
Gold medal – first place	1924 Paris	Team
South American Championship
Winner	1923 Uruguay
Winner	1924 Uruguay
Third place	1922 Brazil
- * Club domestic league appearances and goals

José Vidal (15 December 1896 – 3 July 1974) was a Uruguayan footballer. He was member of Uruguay squad which won gold medal at 1924 Olympics. He was also part of national team which won South American Championship in 1923 and 1924.
