= Vigor Lindberg =

Swedish footballer

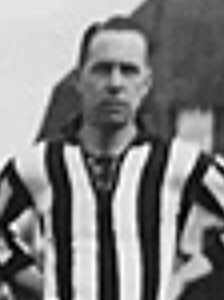
- Lindberg in 1927

Personal information
- Date of birth: 26 April 1899
- Date of death: 28 April 1956 (aged 57)
- Place of death: Norrköping, Sweden
- Position: Forward

Senior career*
Years	Team	Apps	(Gls)
1915–1931	IK Sleipner	137	(44)

International career
1918–1929	Sweden	2	(0)
- * Club domestic league appearances and goals

Vigor "Kuta" Lindberg (26 April 1899 – 28 April 1956) was a Swedish footballer who played as a forward. He made two appearances for the Sweden national team between 1918 and 1929.
