= Alfredo Ghierra =

Uruguayan footballer (1891-1973)

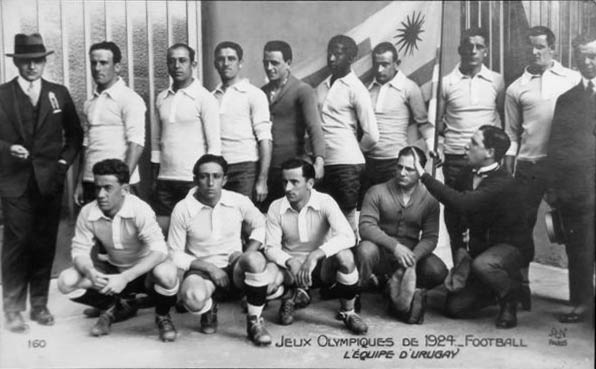

Personal information
- Full name: Alfredo Juan Ghierra Calcagno
- Date of birth: 31 August 1891
- Date of death: 16 November 1973 (aged 82)
- Position: Defender

Senior career*
Years	Team	Apps	(Gls)
- Universal
- Nacional

International career
1923–1926	Uruguay	11	(0)
Medal record
Representing Uruguay
Olympic Games
Gold medal – first place	1924 Paris	Team competition
South American Championship
Winner	1923 Uruguay	Team
Winner	1924 Uruguay	Team
Winner	1926 Chile	Team
- * Club domestic league appearances and goals

Alfredo Juan Ghierra Calcagno (31 August 1891 – 16 November 1973) was a Uruguayan footballer who played for the Uruguay national team.

He was a member of the squads which won the gold medal in the 1924 Olympics, as well as the South American Championship (today's Copa América) three consecutive times: 1923, 1924 and 1926 (they withdrew from the 1925 edition).

Ghierra played club football for Universal and Nacional.
