= Antonio Urdinarán =

Uruguayan footballer (1898-1961)

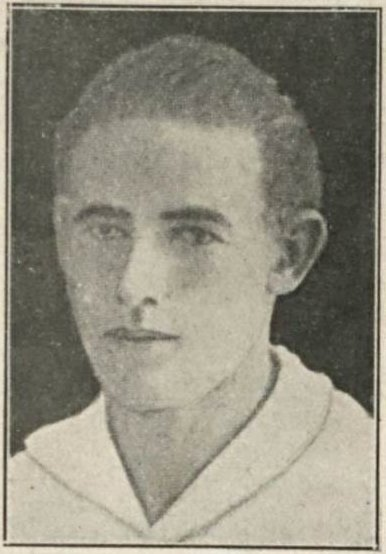
- Antonio Urdinarán in 1919.

Personal information
- Full name: Antonio Urdinarán Barrena
- Date of birth: 30 October 1898
- Place of birth: Montevideo, Uruguay
- Date of death: 8 June 1961 (aged 62)
- Place of death: Montevideo, Uruguay
- Height: 1.69 m (5 ft 7 in)
- Position: Defender

Senior career*
| Years | Team | Apps | (Gls) |
- Defensor Sporting
- Nacional
- Central Español

International career
| 1916–1932 | Uruguay | 18 | (2) |
Medal record
Men's football
Representing Uruguay
Olympic Games
| Gold medal – first place | 1924 Paris | Team |
South American Championship
| Winner | 1916 Argentina |
| Winner | 1917 Uruguay |
| Winner | 1920 Chile |
| Third place | 1922 Brazil |
- * Club domestic league appearances and goals

Antonio Urdinarán Barrena (30 October 1898 – 8 June 1961) was a Uruguayan footballer.

He was a member of four Copa América squads, and was part of the winning squad on three occasions (1916, 1917 & 1920). He was a member of the Uruguay national team that won the gold medal in the 1924 Olympic football tournament, but he did not play in any matches.
