= Rudolf Ramseyer =

Swiss footballer (1897-1943)

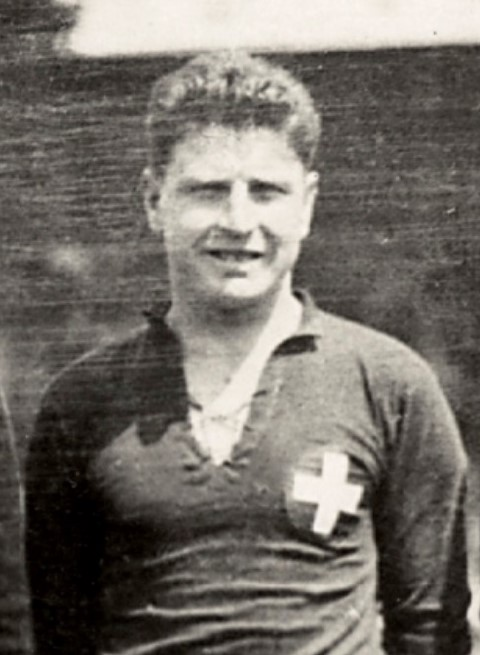
- Rudolf Ramseyer in 1928

Personal information
- Date of birth: 17 September 1897
- Date of death: 13 September 1943 (aged 45)
- Position: Defender

Senior career*
Years	Team	Apps	(Gls)
1919–1925	Young Boys		
1925–1933	FC Bern		

International career
1920–1931	Switzerland	59	(3)
- * Club domestic league appearances and goals

Olympic medal record

Men's Football
Silver medal – second place	1924 Paris	Team competition

Rudolf Ramseyer (17 September 1897 – 13 September 1943) was a Swiss association football player who competed in the 1924 Summer Olympics. He was a member of the Swiss team, which won the silver medal in the football tournament.
