= Hans Pulver =

Swiss footballer (1902-1977)

Personal information
- Date of birth: 28 December 1902
- Place of birth: Switzerland
- Date of death: 8 April 1977 (aged 74)
- Place of death: Switzerland
- Position: Goalkeeper

Senior career*
Years	Team	Apps	(Gls)
1922–1936	BSC Young Boys		

International career
- Switzerland

Managerial career
- 1935–1942: BSC Young Boys
- 1944–1946: FC Bern
- 1948–1949: FC Thun
- * Club domestic league appearances and goals

Olympic medal record

Men's Football
Silver medal – second place	1924 Paris	Team competition

Hans Pulver (28 December 1902 – 8 April 1977) was a Swiss footballer who competed in the 1924 Summer Olympics. He was a member of the Swiss team, which won the silver medal in the football tournament.

He coached BSC Young Boys, FC Bern and FC Thun.
