= Marcel Katz =

Swiss footballer

Personal information
- Date of birth: 9 November 1896
- Date of death: 10 July 1975 (aged 78)

International career
Years	Team	Apps	(Gls)
1923–1924	Switzerland	4	(0)

Marcel Katz (9 November 1896 – 10 July 1975) was a Swiss footballer. He played in four matches for the Switzerland national football team from 1923 to 1924. He was also part of Switzerland's squad for the football tournament at the 1924 Summer Olympics, but he did not play in any matches.
