= Pedro Etchegoyen =

Uruguayan footballer (1894-1969)

Personal information
- Full name: Pedro Domingo Etchegoyen Aramburu
- Date of birth: 21 May 1894
- Place of birth: Montevideo, Uruguay
- Date of death: 1969 (aged 74–75)
- Place of death: Montevideo, Uruguay
- Position: Forward

Senior career*
Years	Team	Apps	(Gls)
- Liverpool

International career
1922–1924	Uruguay	1	(1)
Medal record
Men's football
Representing Uruguay
Olympic Games
Gold medal – first place	1924 Paris	Team
South American Championship
Winner	1923 Uruguay
- * Club domestic league appearances and goals

Pedro Domingo Etchegoyen Aramburu (21 May 1894 – 1969) was a Uruguayan footballer who played as a forward.

== Early life and club career ==
Etchegoyen grew up in the Nuevo París neighbourhood of Montevideo, where he learned to play football at school. While playing at Liverpool in Montevideo, he gained the nickname "Mingo".

== International career ==
Etchegoyen made one appearance for the Uruguay national team, in a 3–1 loss to Argentina on 22 January 1922. He was also a member of their squads at both the 1923 South American Championship and the 1924 Summer Olympics, but played no matches in either. His inclusion in the 1924 Summer Olympics squad was seen as controversial, as some people believed he was not good enough to play for Uruguay.
