= Paul Schmiedlin =

Swiss footballer (1897-1981)

Olympic medal record

Men's Football
Silver medal – second place	1924 Paris	Team competition

Paul Schmiedlin (2 June 1897 – 2 July 1981) was a Swiss association football player who competed in the 1924 Summer Olympics. He was a member of the Swiss team, which won the silver medal in the football tournament.
