= Alfred Probst =

Swiss rower

Personal information
- Born: 1894
- Died: April 1958 (aged 63–64) Basel, Switzerland

Sport
- Sport: Rowing
- Club: RC Lausanne
Medal record
Men's rowing
Representing Switzerland
Olympic Games
Gold medal – first place	1924 Paris	Coxed four
Bronze medal – third place	1924 Paris	Coxless four
European Rowing Championships
Gold medal – first place	1923 Como	Coxed four
Gold medal – first place	1925 Prague	Coxless four

Alfred Probst (1894 – April 1958) was a Swiss rower who competed in the 1924 Summer Olympics. In 1924 he won the gold medal with the Swiss boat in the coxed fours event. He was also part of the Swiss boat which won the bronze medal in the coxless four competition.
