= Jean Haag =

Swiss footballer

Personal information
- Date of birth: 11 May 1895
- Date of death: 7 November 1976 (aged 81)

International career
Years	Team	Apps	(Gls)
1922–1927	Switzerland	7	(0)

Jean Haag (11 May 1895 – 7 November 1976) was a Swiss footballer. He played in seven matches for the Switzerland national football team from 1922 to 1927. He was also part of Switzerland's squad for the football tournament at the 1924 Summer Olympics, but he did not play in any matches.
