= Louis Richard (footballer) =

Swiss footballer

Personal information
- Date of birth: 25 July 1896

International career
Years	Team	Apps	(Gls)
1922–1923	Switzerland	3	(0)

Louis Richard (born 25 July 1896, date of death unknown) was a Swiss footballer. He played in three matches for the Switzerland national football team from 1922 to 1923. He was also part of Switzerland's squad for the football tournament at the 1924 Summer Olympics, but he did not play in any matches.
