= Marcel Slawick =

French football referee

Marcel Slawick was a French football referee during the 1920s; born in Paris, France, on 13 February 1881.

Slawick twice refereed the French Cup Final (in 1921 and 1925), but is perhaps most well known for being the referee at the 1924 Olympic Football final between Switzerland and the eventual winners Uruguay. His selection for the final came about because the Uruguayans disputed the selection of Dutch referee Johannes Mutters after an acrimonious semi final victory over the Dutch. As a result, Slawick's name was drawn out of a hat.

Slawick refereed four games in the Olympics between 1924 and 1928. He died on 15 August 1973.
