= Félix Bédouret =

Swiss footballer (1897-1955)

Personal information
- Born: 1897
- Died: 30 June 1955 (aged 57–58)
Medal record
Men's Football
Representing Switzerland
Olympic Games
Silver medal – second place	1924 Paris	Team competition

Félix Bédouret (1897 – 30 June 1955) was a Swiss football (soccer) player who competed in the 1924 Summer Olympics. He was a member of the Swiss team, which won the silver medal in the football tournament.

== Sources ==
- Félix Bédouret's profile at databaseOlympics
- Evans, Hilary; Gjerde, Arild; Heijmans, Jeroen; Mallon, Bill; et al. "Félix Bédouret". Olympics at Sports-Reference.com. Sports Reference LLC. Archived from the original on 14 December 2012.
