= Eugen Sigg =

Swiss rower

Personal information
- Born: 16 January 1898
- Died: 29 December 1994 (aged 96)

Sport
- Sport: Rowing
- Club: RC Lausanne
Medal record
Men's rowing
Representing Switzerland
Olympic Games
Gold medal – first place	1924 Paris	Coxed four
Bronze medal – third place	1924 Paris	Coxless four
European Rowing Championships
Gold medal – first place	1923 Como	Coxed four
Gold medal – first place	1924 Zürich	Coxed four

Eugen Sigg-Bächthold (16 January 1898 – 29 December 1994), better known as Eugen Sigg, was a Swiss rower who competed in the 1924 Summer Olympics. In 1924, he won the gold medal with the Swiss boat in the coxed four event. He was also part of the Swiss boat which won the bronze medal in the coxless four competition.
