= August Oberhauser =

Swiss footballer (1895-1971)

Olympic medal record

Men's Football
Silver medal – second place	1924 Paris	Team competition

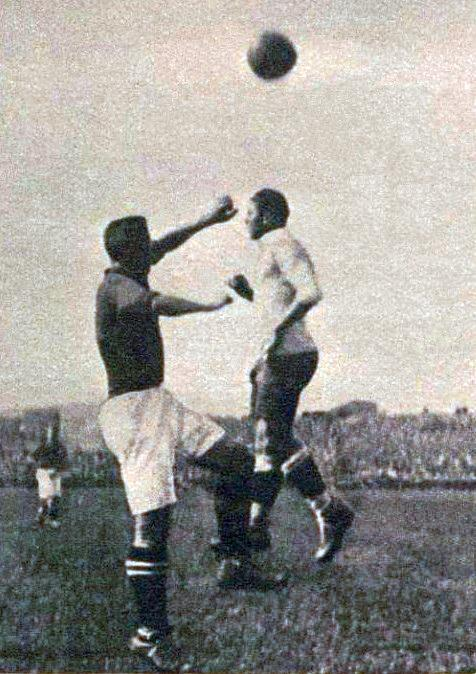
Oberhauser playing against Ángel Romano, 1924 Summer Olympics.

August Oberhauser (4 March 1895 – 1 August 1971) was a Swiss Association football player who competed in the 1924 Summer Olympics. He was a member of the Swiss team, which won the silver medal in the football tournament.
