= Émile Albrecht =

Swiss rower (1897–1927)

Personal information
- Born: 1897
- Died: 11 February 1927 (aged 29–30) St. Moritz, Switzerland

Sport
- Sport: Rowing
- Club: RC Lausanne
Medal record
Men's rowing
Representing Switzerland
Olympic Games
Gold medal – first place	1924 Paris	Coxed four
Bronze medal – third place	1924 Paris	Coxless four
European Rowing Championships
Gold medal – first place	1921 Amsterdam	Coxed four
Gold medal – first place	1921 Amsterdam	Eight
Gold medal – first place	1923 Como	Coxed four
Gold medal – first place	1924 Zürich	Coxed four

Émile Albrecht (1897 – 11 February 1927) was a Swiss rower who competed in the 1924 Summer Olympics.

In 1924 he won the gold medal with the Swiss boat in the coxed four event. He was also part of the Swiss boat which won the bronze medal in the coxless four competition.
