= Theo Schär =

Swiss footballer

International career
Years	Team	Apps	(Gls)
1926	Switzerland	1	(0)

Theo Schär was a Swiss footballer. He played in one match for the Switzerland national football team in 1926. He was also part of Switzerland's squad for the football tournament at the 1924 Summer Olympics, but he did not play in any matches.
