= Robert Pache =

Swiss footballer (1897–1974)

Personal information
- Date of birth: 26 September 1897
- Place of birth: Switzerland
- Date of death: 31 December 1974 (aged 77)
- Position: Striker

Youth career
- Forward Morges

Senior career*
Years	Team	Apps	(Gls)
1917–1919	Servette FC		
1919–1920	CA Paris		
1920–1924	Servette FC		
1924–1930	FSV Frankfurt		

International career
- Switzerland

Managerial career
- 1931–1932: FC Lausanne-Sport
- 1936–1937: Servette FC
- Forward Morges
- * Club domestic league appearances and goals

Olympic medal record

Men's Football
Silver medal – second place	1924 Paris	Team competition

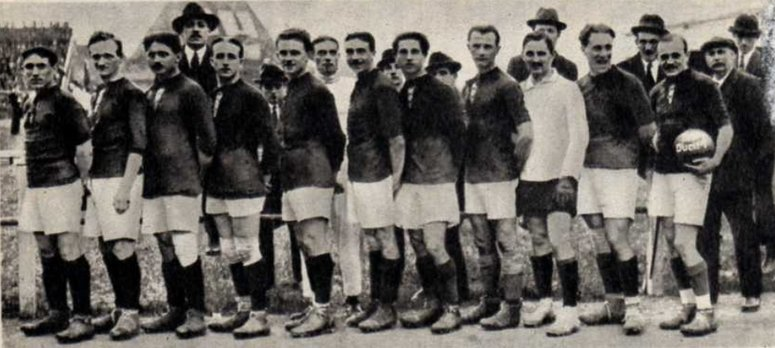
CA Paris 1920.jpg

Robert Pache (26 September 1897 – 31 December 1974) was a Swiss footballer. He competed in the 1924 Summer Olympics. Pache was a member of the Swiss team, which won the silver medal in the football tournament.

He played for Servette FC, CA Paris and FSV Frankfurt. He coached FC Lausanne-Sport, Servette FC and Forward Morges.
