= Adolphe Reymond =

Swiss footballer (1896–1976)

Olympic medal record

Men's Football
Silver medal – second place	1924 Paris	Team competition

Adolphe Reymond (4 September 1896 – 7 March 1976) was a Swiss association football player who competed in the 1924 Summer Olympics. He was a member of the Swiss team, which won the silver medal in the football tournament.
