= Johannes Mutters =

Dutch football referee (1899–1974)

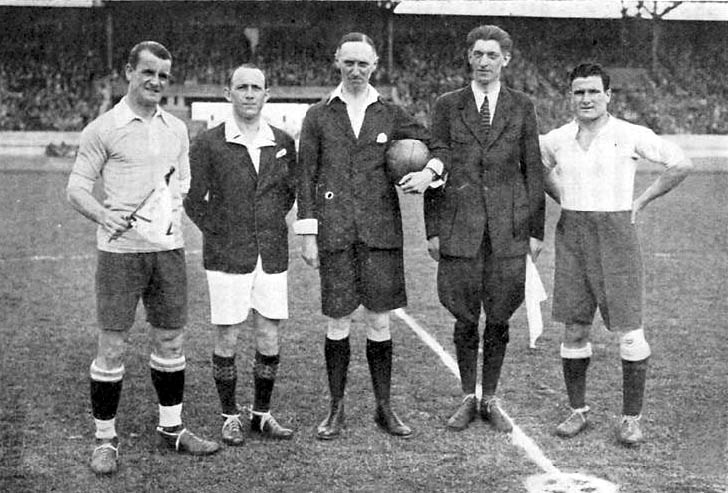
- Mutters in the middle
- Full name: D. Johannes (Job) Mutters
- Born: 19 February 1899; The Hague, Netherlands
- Died: 8 March 1974 (aged 75); Leidschendam, Netherlands
Years		Role
1919–1935		Referee

D. Johannes (Job) Mutters (19 February 1899 in The Hague – 8 March 1974 in Leidschendam) was a Dutch international football referee during the 1920s and early 1930s.

Mutters came to international prominence during the 1920s alongside Willem Eymers. Both men represented the Netherlands in the 1920 Olympic Games football tournament. Mutters took charge of three matches during the medal tournament, including one of the semi-finals (that involving Czechoslovakia).

Mutters took charge of a further semi-final in the 1924 edition of the series; Switzerland defeated Sweden to play against Uruguay in the final. He was selected to referee the final, but in the second semi-final Holland had been defeated by Uruguay and the Uruguayans disputed the involvement of a Dutch referee. Consequently, Marcel Slawick was drawn from a hat.

Finally, Mutters was awarded the final of the 1928 tournament, a precursor to the 1930 World Cup final, in which Argentina played Uruguay. Mutters was the referee in the original final as well as the replay after the initial match ended in a 1-1 draw.

In addition Mutters took charge of five internationals played by England between 1921 and 1930, including both matches versus Germany and Austria during the 1930 tour. He had no involvement in the 1930 FIFA World Cup because the Netherlands did not participate.
