= Pascual Somma =

Uruguayan football player (1896–1930)

Personal information
- Full name: Pascual Somma Noya
- Date of birth: 2 February 1891
- Place of birth: Montevideo, Uruguay
- Date of death: 12 August 1930 (aged 39)
- Place of death: Montevideo, Uruguay
- Position: Forward

Senior career*
Years	Team	Apps	(Gls)
- Nacional
- Defensor Sporting
- Nacional

International career
1911–1923	Uruguay	41	(3)
Medal record
Men's football
Representing Uruguay
South American Championship
Winner	1916 Argentina
Winner	1917 Uruguay
Winner	1920 Chile
Winner	1923 Uruguay
Runner-up	1919 Brazil
Third place	1921 Argentina
Third place	1922 Brazil
- * Club domestic league appearances and goals

Pascual Somma Noya (2 February 1891 – 12 August 1930) was a Uruguayan footballer who played as a forward. He was part of Uruguay's squad for the 1924 Summer Olympics, but he did not play in any matches.

== Career statistics ==
=== International ===
National team	Year	Apps	Goals
Uruguay	1911	2	0
Uruguay	1912	0	0
Uruguay	1913	0	0
Uruguay	1914	0	0
Uruguay	1915	0	0
Uruguay	1916	6	0
Uruguay	1917	5	0
Uruguay	1918	3	1
Uruguay	1919	3	0
Uruguay	1920	6	1
Uruguay	1921	3	0
Uruguay	1922	6	0
Uruguay	1923	7	1
Total		41	3
