= Gustav Gottenkieny =

Swiss footballer (1896-1959)

Personal information
- Date of birth: 8 May 1896
- Place of birth: Winterthur, Switzerland
- Date of death: September 1959

International career
Years	Team	Apps	(Gls)
1920–1925	Switzerland	14	(0)

Gustav Gottenkieny (8 May 1896 – September 1959) was a Swiss footballer. He played in fourteen matches for the Switzerland national football team between 1920 and 1925.
