= Football at the 1924 Summer Olympics – Men's team squads =

The following squads were named for the 1924 Summer Olympics tournament.

== Belgium ==
Head coach: (Scotland) William Maxwell

No.	Pos.	Player	Date of birth (age)	Caps	Club
	MF	Désiré Bastin	4 March 1900 (aged 24)		(Belgium) Royal Antwerp F.C.
	FW	Robert Coppée	23 April 1895 (aged 29)		(Belgium) Union Saint-Gilloise
	GK	Jean De Bie	9 May 1892 (aged 32)		(Belgium) RC Brussels
	DF	François Demol	19 August 1895 (aged 28)		(Belgium) Union Saint-Gilloise
	MF	Georges De Spae	30 September 1900 (aged 23)		(Belgium) La Gantoise
	MF	André Fierens	8 February 1898 (aged 26)		(Belgium) Beerschot
	FW	Maurice Gillis	6 November 1897 (aged 26)		(Belgium) Standard de Liège
	MF	Laurent Grimmonprez	14 December 1902 (aged 21)		(Belgium) RC de Gand
	MF	Émile Hanse	10 August 1892 (aged 31)		(Belgium) Union Saint-Gilloise
	MF	Albert Henderickx	7 October 1903 (aged 20)		(Belgium) Beerschot
	FW	Victor Houet	2 September 1900 (aged 23)		(Belgium) Tilleuer FC
	MF	Henri Larnoe	18 May 1897 (aged 27)		(Belgium) Beerschot
	DF	Fernand Lorphèvre			(Belgium) White Star A.C.
	DF	Joseph Musch	12 October 1893 (aged 30)		(Belgium) Union Saint-Gilloise
	GK	Joseph Paty	6 January 1896 (aged 28)		(Belgium) Standard de Liège
	DF	Auguste Pelsmaeker	15 November 1899 (aged 24)		(Belgium) Beerschot
	MF	Achille Schelstraete	31 January 1897 (aged 27)		(Belgium) Cercle Brugge
	DF	Armand Swartenbroeks	30 June 1892 (aged 31)		(Belgium) Daring Club
	FW	Ivan Thys	29 April 1897 (aged 27)		(Belgium) Beerschot
	MF	Florimond Vanhalme	21 March 1895 (aged 29)		(Belgium) Cercle Brugge
	FW	Louis Van Hege	8 May 1889 (aged 35)		(Belgium) Union Saint-Gilloise
	DF	Oscar Verbeeck	6 June 1891 (aged 32)		(Belgium) Union Saint-Gilloise

== Bulgaria ==
Head coach: (Austria) Leopold Nitsch

No.	Pos.	Player	Date of birth (age)	Caps	Club
	DF	Boris Bonov	20 October 1898 (aged 25)		(Bulgaria) Ticha Varna
	FW	Tsvetan Genev	13 November 1898 (aged 25)		(Bulgaria) Levski Sofia
	DF	Aleksandar Hristov	31 May 1904 (aged 19)		(Bulgaria) Levski Sofia
	GK	Petar Ivanov	29 June 1903 (aged 20)		(Bulgaria) Levski Sofia
	MF	Dimitar Manolov	14 January 1901 (aged 23)		(Bulgaria) Slavia Sofia
	GK	Nikola Marinov			(Bulgaria) Diana Varna
	MF	Geno Mateev	3 January 1903 (aged 21)		(Bulgaria) Levski Sofia
	FW	Konstantin Maznikov	5 April 1905 (aged 19)		(Bulgaria) Levski Sofia
	FW	Dimitar Mutafchiev	10 January 1902 (aged 22)		(Bulgaria) Levski Sofia
	FW	Nikola Mutafchiev	10 August 1904 (aged 19)		(Bulgaria) Levski Sofia
	DF	Ivan Radoev	9 September 1901 (aged 22)		(Bulgaria) Levski Sofia
	FW	Grigor Stoyanov			(Bulgaria) Slavia Sofia
	MF	Stefan Tsonchev			(Bulgaria) FC 13 Sofia
	FW	Todor Vladimirov	29 July 1895 (aged 28)		(Bulgaria) Slavia Sofia
	DF	Simeon Yankov	17 February 1899 (aged 25)		(Bulgaria) Levski Sofia
	FW	Kiril Yovovich	29 December 1905 (aged 18)		(Bulgaria) Levski Sofia
	MF	Kiril Denev	1905		(Bulgaria) Vladislav Varna
	MF	Kiril Krapchanski			(Bulgaria) Slavia Sofia
	FW	Nikola Lyutskanov	28 September 1902 (aged 21)		(Bulgaria) Ticha Varna
	DF	Boris Stavrev	22 October 1901 (aged 22)		(Bulgaria) Vladislav Varna
	FW	Velcho Stoyanov	1907		(Bulgaria) Slavia Sofia
	FW	Vladimir Tsvetkov			(Bulgaria) Slavia Sofia

6 players (Denev, Krapchanski, Lyutskanov, Stavrev, V. Stoyanov, Tsvetkov) were included in the formal application, but due to financial constraints in the Bulgarian Football Union, did not go to Paris

== Czechoslovakia ==
Head coach: (Czechoslovakia) Jaroslav Bezecný

No.	Pos.	Player	Date of birth (age)	Caps	Club
	FW	Josef Čapek	1 August 1902 (aged 21)		(Czechoslovakia) SK Slavia Prague
	MF	Jaroslav Červený	1 June 1895 (aged 28)		(Czechoslovakia) AC Sparta Prague
	GK	František Hochmann	2 April 1904 (aged 20)		(Czechoslovakia) AC Sparta Prague
	DF	Antonín Hojer	13 March 1894 (aged 30)		(Czechoslovakia) AC Sparta Prague
	DF	František Hojer	27 April 1896 (aged 28)		(Czechoslovakia) FK Viktoria Žižkov
	FW	Josef Jelínek	27 March 1902 (aged 22)		(Czechoslovakia) FK Viktoria Žižkov
	MF	František Kolenatý	29 January 1900 (aged 24)		(Czechoslovakia) AC Sparta Prague
	FW	Josef Kratochvíl	9 February 1905 (aged 19)		(Czechoslovakia) SK Slavia Prague
	MF	Otto Krombholz	3 February 1899 (aged 25)		(Czechoslovakia) DFC Prag
	DF	Josef Kuchynka	4 August 1894 (aged 29)		(Czechoslovakia) DFC Prag
	MF	Pavel Mahrer	23 May 1900 (aged 24)		(Czechoslovakia) DFC Prag
	FW	Jan Novák	5 July 1896 (aged 27)		(Czechoslovakia) SK Židenice
	FW	Josef Novák	20 October 1900 (aged 23)		(Czechoslovakia) SK Židenice
	FW	Otto Novák	22 March 1902 (aged 22)		(Czechoslovakia) FK Viktoria Žižkov
	MF	Karel Pešek	20 September 1895 (aged 28)		(Czechoslovakia) AC Sparta Prague
	MF	Josef Pleticha	10 February 1902 (aged 22)		(Czechoslovakia) SK Slavia Prague
	FW	Antonín Řehák	1902		(Czechoslovakia) SK Meteor Vinohrady (Praha)
	FW	Josef Sedláček	15 December 1893 (aged 30)		(Czechoslovakia) AC Sparta Prague
	DF	Emil Seifert	28 April 1900 (aged 24)		(Czechoslovakia) SK Slavia Prague
	GK	Josef Sloup	19 December 1897 (aged 26)		(Czechoslovakia) SK Slavia Prague
	FW	Rudolf Sloup	17 November 1895 (aged 28)		(Czechoslovakia) SK Slavia Prague
	FW	Jaroslav Vlček	3 September 1900 (aged 23)		(Czechoslovakia) Čechie Karlín

== Egypt ==
Head coach: (Egypt) Hussein Hegazi

No.	Pos.	Player	Date of birth (age)	Caps	Club
	MF	Ali El-Hassani	1897		(Egypt) Al Ahly
	FW	Sayed Houda	1900		(Egypt) Al Ittihad Alexandria
	DF	Mohammed El-Mahdwy			
	DF	Sayed Abaza			(Egypt) Al Ahly
	DF	Fouad Gamil	1897		(Egypt) Zamalek
	MF	Abdel Salam Hamdy	1894		(Egypt) Zamalek
	FW	Hussein Hegazi	14 September 1889 (aged 34)		(Egypt) Zamalek
	MF	Riskalla Henain	1903		(Egypt) Al Ahly
	FW	Mahmoud Houda	1899		(Egypt) Al Ittihad Alexandria
	FW	Khalil Housny			(Egypt) Al Ahly
	FW	Ahmed Mansour			(Egypt) Al Ahly
	GK	Mahmoud Marey			(Egypt) Zamalek
	MF	Abdel Kader Mohamed			(Egypt) Tersana SC
	DF	Abdel Hamid Moharrem			
	FW	Mahmoud Mokhtar El Tetsh	29 September 1905 (aged 18)		(Egypt) Al Ahly
	MF	Gamil Osman			(Egypt) Zamalek
	FW	Ali Riadh	1904		(Egypt) Zamalek
	GK	Mohamed Rostam			(Egypt) Al-Sekka Al-Hadid
	DF	Ahmed Salem			(Egypt) Zamalek
	MF	Riadh Shawki	1893		(Egypt) Al Ahly
	GK	Kamel Taha	1897		(Egypt) Al Ahly
	FW	Ibrahim Yakan	1900		(Egypt) Zamalek

Abaza Sayed Fahmy: In the lists of FIFA – the player Sayed ABAZA played in tournaments of 1920 and 1928 The same player in a football tournament in 1924 was in the reserve team in Egypt. Everywhere on the sites FIFA writing given to the player – Abaza Sayed FAHMY And so for all sites, the same footballer is written everywhere in different ways

== Estonia ==
Head coach: (Hungary) Ferenc Kónya

No.	Pos.	Player	Date of birth (age)	Caps	Club
	FW	Johannes Brenner	16 January 1906 (aged 18)		(Estonia) Kalev Tallinn
	MF	Eugen Einman	6 October 1905 (aged 18)		(Estonia) Sport Tallinn
	FW	Eduard Ellmann	7 April 1902 (aged 22)		(Estonia) Kalev Tallinn
	FW	Aleksander Gerassimov	11 February 1904 (aged 20)		(Estonia) Sport Tallinn
	DF	Sergei Javorsky	9 June 1902 (aged 21)		(Estonia) Sport Tallinn
	FW	Ernst Joll	10 September 1902 (aged 21)		(Estonia) Kalev Tallinn
	FW	Alfei Jürgenson	8 April 1904 (aged 20)		(Estonia) TJK Tallinn
	MF	Harald Kaarmann	27 December 1901 (aged 22)		(Estonia) Kalev Tallinn
	MF	Elmar Kaljot	15 November 1901 (aged 22)		(Estonia) Kalev Tallinn
	FW	Johannes Kichlefeldt	23 November 1901 (aged 22)		(Estonia) Sport Tallinn
	GK	August Lass	16 August 1903 (aged 20)		(Estonia) Kalev Tallinn
	MF	Johannes Lello	25 November 1895 (aged 28)		(Estonia) Kalev Tallinn
	DF	Ralf Liivar	2 April 1903 (aged 21)		(Estonia) Kalev Tallinn
	FW	Heinrich Paal	26 June 1895 (aged 28)		(Estonia) Sport Tallinn
	DF	Arnold Pihlak	17 July 1902 (aged 21)		(Estonia) Kalev Tallinn
	MF	Bernhard Rein	19 November 1897 (aged 26)		(Estonia) Sport Tallinn
	FW	Voldemar Rõks	15 July 1900 (aged 23)		(Estonia) Kalev Tallinn
	DF	Otto Silber	17 March 1893 (aged 31)		(Estonia) TJK Tallinn
	GK	Evald Tipner	13 March 1906 (aged 18)		(Estonia) Sport Tallinn
	FW	Oskar Üpraus	12 October 1898 (aged 25)		(Estonia) Sport Tallinn
	FW	Hugo Väli	19 June 1902 (aged 21)		(Estonia) Kalev Tallinn
	MF	Raimond Põder	3 January 1903 (aged 21)		(Estonia) Kalev Tallinn

Note: 6 players – Brenner, Einman, Gerassimov, Javorsky, Kichlefeldt and Lello – although included in the official squad submitted to FIFA, did not travel to France and stayed in Estonia in reserve.

== France ==
Head coach: (England) Charles Griffiths

No.	Pos.	Player	Date of birth (age)	Caps	Club
	MF	Henri Bard	29 April 1892 (aged 32)		(France) RC Paris
	MF	Jean Batmale	18 September 1895 (aged 28)		(France) Rennes
	DF	Édouard Baumann	4 March 1895 (aged 29)		(France) CASG Paris
	MF	Philippe Bonnardel	28 July 1899 (aged 24)		(France) Red Star
	FW	Jean Boyer	2 February 1901 (aged 23)		(France) Marseille
	DF	Jacques Canthelou	29 March 1904 (aged 20)		(France) FC Rouen
	GK	Pierre Chayriguès	1 May 1892 (aged 32)		(France) Red Star
	FW	Pierre Chesneau	10 April 1902 (aged 22)		(France) F.C. Blidéen (Blida, Algeria)
	GK	Maurice Cottenet	11 February 1895 (aged 29)		(France) Olympique de Paris
	MF	Édouard Crut	16 April 1901 (aged 23)		(France) Marseille
	FW	Jules Dewaquez	9 March 1899 (aged 25)		(France) Olympique de Paris
	MF	Marcel Domergue	16 November 1901 (aged 22)		(France) SC Nîmes
	FW	Raymond Dubly	5 November 1893 (aged 30)		(France) RC Roubaix
	FW	Robert Dufour	1902		(France) Olympique de Paris
	FW	Ernest Gravier	26 August 1892 (aged 31)		(France) Cette
	MF	Ernest Gross	22 December 1902 (aged 21)		(France) Red Star Strasbourg
	DF	Léon Huot	31 December 1898 (aged 25)		(France) Olympique Alès
	FW	Gérard Isbecque	15 March 1897 (aged 27)		(France) RC Roubaix
	MF	Albert Jourda	4 January 1893 (aged 31)		(France) Cette
	FW	Paul Nicolas	4 November 1899 (aged 24)		(France) Red Star
	MF	Antoine Parachini	12 July 1897 (aged 26)		(France) Cette
	FW	Albert Rénier	8 May 1896 (aged 28)		(France) Le Havre AC

== Hungary ==
Head coach: (Hungary) Gyula Kiss

No.	Pos.	Player	Date of birth (age)	Caps	Club
	GK	János Biri	21 July 1901 (aged 22)	1	(Hungary) Kispesti AC
	FW	József Braun	26 February 1901 (aged 23)	18	(Hungary) MTK Budapest
	FW	József Eisenhoffer	8 November 1900 (aged 23)	5	(Hungary) Ferencvárosi TC
	DF	József Fogl	14 August 1897 (aged 26)	10	(Hungary) Újpesti TE
	DF	Károly Fogl	19 January 1895 (aged 29)	26	(Hungary) Újpesti TE
	DF	Dezső Grósz	19 September 1898 (aged 25)	0	(Hungary) VAC
	MF	Béla Guttmann	13 March 1900 (aged 24)	2	(Austria) Hakoah Wien
	MF	Árpád Hajós	15 March 1902 (aged 22)	2	(Czechoslovakia) Makkabi Brno
	FW	Ferenc Hirzer	21 November 1902 (aged 21)	11	(Czechoslovakia) Makkabi Brno
	FW	Rudolf Jeny	2 March 1901 (aged 23)	6	(Hungary) MTK Budapest
	GK	Ferenc Kropacsek	7 September 1899 (aged 24)	1	(Hungary) MTK Budapest
	DF	Gyula Mándi	21 January 1899 (aged 25)	12	(Hungary) MTK Budapest
	FW	György Molnár	12 February 1901 (aged 23)	16	(Hungary) MTK Budapest
	MF	Henrik Nádler	19 March 1901 (aged 23)	0	(Hungary) MTK Budapest
	MF	Gábor Obitz	18 January 1899 (aged 25)	3	(Czechoslovakia) Makkabi Brno
	FW	Zoltán Opata	24 September 1900 (aged 23)	5	(Hungary) MTK Budapest
	FW	György Orth	30 April 1901 (aged 23)	17	(Hungary) MTK Budapest
	FW	József Takács	30 June 1904 (aged 19)	2	(Hungary) Vasas SC
	MF	Gyula Tóth	10 June 1901 (aged 22)	5	(Hungary) KAOE Budapest
	FW	Árpád Weisz	16 April 1896 (aged 28)	6	(Czechoslovakia) Maccabi Brno
	GK	Károly Zsák	30 August 1895 (aged 28)	24	(Hungary) 33 FC Budapest

== Irish Free State ==
Head coach: (Irish Free State) Charles Harris

No.	Pos.	Player	Date of birth (age)	Caps	Club
	MF	Robert Cowzer			(Republic of Ireland) Shelbourne
	DF	Ernie Crawford	17 November 1891 (aged 32)		(Republic of Ireland) Bohemians
	FW	Charlie Dowdall	7 April 1898 (aged 26)		(Republic of Ireland) St James's Gate
	FW	Paddy Duncan	1894		(Republic of Ireland) St James's Gate
	MF	John Joe Dykes			(Republic of Ireland) Athlone Town
	FW	Michael Farrell			(Republic of Ireland) St James's Gate
	FW	Frank Ghent			(Republic of Ireland) Athlone Town
	MF	Dinny Hannon	31 January 1888 (aged 36)		(Republic of Ireland) Athlone Town
	FW	Frank Heaney	23 November 1886 (aged 37)		(Republic of Ireland) St James's Gate
	FW	Joe Kendrick	26 June 1905 (aged 18)		(Republic of Ireland) Brooklyn F.C.
	DF	Herbert Kerr	19 October 1896 (aged 27)		(Republic of Ireland) Bohemians
	FW	John Lea			(Republic of Ireland) Shelbourne
	DF	Jack McCarthy	1898		(Republic of Ireland) Bohemians
	MF	Ernest McKay	7 October 1896 (aged 27)		(Republic of Ireland) St James's Gate
	MF	Tommy Muldoon	14 February 1901 (aged 23)		(Republic of Ireland) Athlone Town
	FW	Johnny Murray	25 February 1898 (aged 26)		(Republic of Ireland) Bohemians
	DF	Thomas Murphy			(Republic of Ireland) St James's Gate
	GK	Paddy O'Reilly			(Republic of Ireland) Athlone Town
	MF	Christy Robinson			(Republic of Ireland) Bohemians
	MF	John Thomas			(Republic of Ireland) Bohemians
	GK	Thomas Aungier			(Republic of Ireland) St James's Gate
	FW	John Healy			(Republic of Ireland) Bray Unknowns F.C.(Dublin)

Note: 5 players (Cowzer, Heaney, Lea, Aungier, Healy) did not travel to France and stayed in Ireland on reserve.

== Italy ==
Head coach: (Italy) Vittorio Pozzo

No.	Pos.	Player	Date of birth (age)	Caps	Club
	MF	Giuseppe Aliberti	5 March 1901 (aged 23)		(Italy) Torino
	MF	Mario Ardissone	9 October 1900 (aged 23)		(Italy) Pro Vercelli
	MF	Gastone Baldi	14 May 1901 (aged 23)		(Italy) Bologna
	FW	Adolfo Baloncieri	27 July 1897 (aged 26)		(Italy) Alessandria
	MF	Ottavio Barbieri	30 April 1899 (aged 25)		(Italy) Genoa
	DF	Antonio Bruna	14 February 1895 (aged 29)		(Italy) Juventus
	MF	Luigi Burlando	23 January 1899 (aged 25)		(Italy) Genoa
	DF	Umberto Caligaris	26 July 1901 (aged 22)		(Italy) Casale
	GK	Gianpiero Combi	20 December 1902 (aged 21)		(Italy) Juventus
	FW	Leopoldo Conti	12 April 1901 (aged 23)		(Italy) F.C. Internazionale Milano
	FW	Giuseppe Della Valle	25 November 1899 (aged 24)		(Italy) Bologna
	GK	Giovanni De Prà	28 June 1900 (aged 23)		(Italy) Genoa
	DF	Renzo De Vecchi	3 February 1894 (aged 30)		(Italy) Genoa
	MF	Antonio Fayenz	2 November 1899 (aged 24)		(Italy) Padova
	MF	Antonio Janni	19 September 1904 (aged 19)		(Italy) Torino
	FW	Virgilio Levratto	26 October 1904 (aged 19)		(Italy) Vado F.C.
	FW	Mario Magnozzi	20 March 1902 (aged 22)		(Italy) Livorno
	DF	Cesare Martin	14 May 1901 (aged 23)		(Italy) Torino
	FW	Feliciano Monti	19 December 1902 (aged 21)		(Italy) Padova
	DF	Virginio Rosetta	25 February 1902 (aged 22)		(Italy) Juventus
	MF	Severino Rosso	13 December 1898 (aged 25)		(Italy) Pro Vercelli
	FW	Giuseppe Calvi			(Italy) Torino

== Latvia ==
Head coach: (Latvia) Juris Rēdlihs

No.	Pos.	Player	Date of birth (age)	Caps	Goals	Club
	DF	Kārlis Ašmanis	1898	2	0	(Latvian Football Federation) Rīgas FK
	FW	Arvīds Bārda	11 November 1901 (aged 22)	2	1	(Latvian Football Federation) Rīgas FK
	FW	Edvīns Bārda	6 April 1900 (aged 24)	2	1	(Latvian Football Federation) Rīgas FK
	FW	Rūdolfs Bārda	7 February 1903 (aged 21)	1	0	(Latvian Football Federation) Rīgas FK
	MF	Kārlis Bone	19 February 1899 (aged 25)	2	0	(Latvian Football Federation) Rīgas FK
	GK	Ādolfs Greble	10 October 1902 (aged 21)	1	0	(Latvian Football Federation) LSB Rīga
	MF	Indriķis Greble		0	0	(Latvian Football Federation) LSB Rīga
	FW	Arveds Hammers		0	0	(Latvian Football Federation) LSB Rīga
	GK	Arvīds Jurgens	27 May 1905 (aged 18)	0	0	(Latvian Football Federation) Rīgas FK
	FW	Pēteris Kreicbergs		0	0	(Latvian Football Federation) Amatieris
	DF	Pēteris Lauks	10 February 1902 (aged 22)	0	0	(Latvian Football Federation) Amatieris
	DF	Emils Oše		0	0	(Latvian Football Federation) LSB Rīga
	FW	Markuss Osis		0	0	(Latvian Football Federation) Rīgas FK
	FW	Arkādijs Pavlovs	2 February 1903 (aged 21)	0	0	(Latvian Football Federation) Rīgas FK
	DF	Alfrēds Plade		1	0	(Latvian Football Federation) Ķeizarmežs
	DF	Kurts Plade		1	0	(Latvian Football Federation) Ķeizarmežs
	FW	Voldemārs Plade	24 December 1900 (aged 23)	1	0	(Latvian Football Federation) Ķeizarmežs
	DF	Aleksandrs Roge	1898	1	0	(Latvian Football Federation) Rīgas FK
	MF	Pauls Sokolovs	1902	1	0	(Latvian Football Federation) Rīgas FK
	MF	Česlavs Stančiks	26 August 1898 (aged 25)	2	0	(Latvian Football Federation) Ķeizarmežs
	FW	Artūrs Timpers		0	0	(Latvian Football Federation) Rīgas FK
	MF	Voldemārs Viņķis	1904	0	0	(Latvian Football Federation) Rīgas FK

Note: 5 players (I.Greble, Hammers, Lauks, Timpers, Viņķis) did not travel to France and stayed in Latvia on reserve.

== Lithuania ==
No.	Pos.	Player	Date of birth (age)	Caps	Club
	GK	Valerijonas Balčiūnas	27 November 1904 (aged 19)	0	(Lithuania) ŠŠ Kovas Kaunas
	MF	Vincas Bartuška	14 April 1901 (aged 23)	1	(Lithuania) LFLS Kaunas
	MF	Barstaitis		1	(Lithuania) MTV Klapedia
	FW	Stepas Garbačiauskas	17 April 1900 (aged 24)	1	(Lithuania) KSK Kaunas
	FW	Hansas Gecas	24 September 1899 (aged 24)	0	(Lithuania) KSK Kaunas
	DF	Jurgis Hardingsonas	24 September 1892 (aged 31)	0	(Lithuania) KSK Kaunas
	DF	Stasys Janušauskas	13 May 1902 (aged 22)	0	(Lithuania) ŠŠ Kovas Kaunas
	MF	Leonas Juozapaitis	18 November 1901 (aged 22)	1	(Lithuania) LFLS Kaunas
	FW	Edvardas Mikučiauskas	23 August 1901 (aged 22)	0	(Lithuania) ŠŠ Kovas Kaunas
	MF	Stasys Razma	1899	1	(Lithuania) LFLS Kaunas
	FW	Stasys Sabaliauskas	1905	0	(Lithuania) ŠŠ Kovas Kaunas
	FW	Juozas Žebrauskas	31 August 1904 (aged 19)	0	(Lithuania) ŠŠ Kovas Kaunas
	GK	Steponas Darius	8 January 1896 (aged 28)	0	(Lithuania) LFLS Kaunas
	DF	Leonas Gelermanas		0	(Lithuania) Makabi Kaunas
	MF	Gustavas Gvildys		1	(Lithuania) FK Sportverein Klaipėda
	DF	Ernestas Deringas	1899	1	(Lithuania) MTV Klaipeda
	MF	Motis Strazdas		0	(Lithuania) KSK Kaunas

Note: 6 players (Darius, Deringas, Strazdas, Bartatais, Gelermanas and Gvildys) did not travel to France and stayed in Lithuania on reserve. Juozas Žebrauskas traveled with the team but was not registered, he played under the identity of Bartatais

== Luxembourg ==
Head coach: (Luxembourg) Batty Schroeder

No.	Pos.	Player	Date of birth (age)	Caps	Club
	GK	Étienne Bausch	17 June 1901 (aged 22)		(Luxembourg) Stade Dudelange
	GK	Maurice Droessart			(Luxembourg) Red Boys Differdingen
	MF	Robert Elter	20 April 1899 (aged 25)		Spora Luxembourg
	DF	Arthur Ginter	20 May 1898 (aged 26)		(Luxembourg) CS Fola Esch
	DF	Paul Feierstein	27 January 1903 (aged 21)		(Luxembourg) Red Boys Differdange
	DF	Albert Flammang	18 December 1899 (aged 24)		(Luxembourg) Stade Dudelange
	DF	Mathias Feller	12 October 1904 (aged 19)		Spora Luxembourg
	DF	Alfred Kieffer	11 January 1904 (aged 20)		(Luxembourg) Red Boys Differdange
	DF	Nicolas Kirsch	24 August 1901 (aged 22)		Spora Luxembourg
	DF	Joseph Koetz	29 May 1897 (aged 26)		(Luxembourg) CS Fola Esch
	DF	Émile Kolb	3 June 1902 (aged 21)		(Luxembourg) Red Boys Differdange
	MF	Pierre Kremer	4 February 1900 (aged 24)		(Luxembourg) Red Boys Differdingen
	FW	François Langers	16 March 1896 (aged 28)		(Luxembourg) Jeunesse Esch
	FW	Léon Lefèvre	28 November 1904 (aged 19)		Spora Luxembourg
	MF	Albert Massard	30 August 1900 (aged 23)		(Luxembourg) CS Fola Esch
	MF	Paul Rouster	19 May 1900 (aged 24)		Spora Luxembourg
	DF	Marcel Schumann	15 January 1901 (aged 23)		Spora Luxembourg
	DF	Albert Stirn	13 September 1903 (aged 20)		Spora Luxembourg
	MF	François Weber	21 December 1899 (aged 24)		Spora Luxembourg
	MF	Jean-Pierre Weber	31 December 1900 (aged 23)		(Luxembourg) CS Fola Esch
	FW	Ferdinand Weiler			(Luxembourg) Red Boys Differdingen
	FW	Jean-Pierre Weisgerber	28 March 1905 (aged 19)		(Luxembourg) CS Fola Esch

Note: 6 players (Elter, Ginter, Feller, Kremer, Lefèvre, Stirn) did not travel to France and stayed in Luxembourg on reserve.

== Netherlands ==
Head coach: (England) William Townley

No.	Pos.	Player	Date of birth (age)	Caps	Club
	GK	Jan de Boer	29 August 1898 (aged 25)		(Netherlands) Ajax
	FW	Joop ter Beek	1 June 1901 (aged 22)		(Netherlands) NAC
	FW	Klaas Breeuwer	25 November 1901 (aged 22)		(Netherlands) Haarlem
	DF	Harry Dénis	28 August 1896 (aged 27)		(Netherlands) HBS
	FW	Ok Formenoy	16 March 1899 (aged 25)		(Netherlands) Sparta
	FW	Ber Groosjohan	16 June 1897 (aged 26)		(Netherlands) VOC
	MF	Gerrit Horsten	16 April 1900 (aged 24)		(Netherlands) Willem II
	FW	Albert Snouck Hurgronje	30 May 1902 (aged 21)		(Netherlands) HVV
	MF	Peer Krom	10 March 1898 (aged 26)		(Netherlands) RCH
	MF	André Le Fèvre	12 December 1898 (aged 25)		(Netherlands) SV Kampong
	MF	Evert van Linge	19 November 1895 (aged 28)		(Netherlands) Be Quick
	GK	Gejus van der Meulen	23 January 1903 (aged 21)		(Netherlands) HFC
	FW	Jan de Natris	13 November 1895 (aged 28)		(Netherlands) Ajax
	MF	Jan Oosthoek	5 March 1898 (aged 26)		(Netherlands) Sparta
	FW	Kees Pijl	9 June 1897 (aged 26)		(Netherlands) Feijenoord
	FW	Dick Sigmond	22 May 1897 (aged 27)		(Netherlands) DFC
	DF	Hans Tetzner	9 June 1898 (aged 25)		(Netherlands) Be Quick
	FW	Henk Vermetten	19 August 1895 (aged 28)		(Netherlands) HBS
	DF	Ben Verweij	31 August 1895 (aged 28)		(Netherlands) HFC
	FW	Gerrit Visser	2 February 1903 (aged 21)		(Netherlands) Stormvogels
	FW	Louis Lash	24 October 1902 (aged 21)		(Netherlands) HBS
	MF	Henk Roomberg	27 February 1895 (aged 29)		(Netherlands) Sparta

== Poland ==
Head coach: (Poland) Adam Obrubański

No.	Pos.	Player	Date of birth (age)	Caps	Club
	FW	Józef Adamek	21 February 1900 (aged 24)	0	(Poland) Wisła Kraków
	FW	Mieczysław Batsch	1 January 1900 (aged 24)	5	(Poland) Pogoń Lwów
	MF	Stanisław Cikowski	14 February 1899 (aged 25)	8	(Poland) Cracovia
	DF	Wawrzyniec Cyl	2 July 1900 (aged 23)	1	(Poland) ŁKS Łódź
	DF	Stefan Fryc	19 August 1894 (aged 29)	7	(Poland) Cracovia
	DF	Ludwik Gintel	26 September 1899 (aged 24)	8	(Poland) Cracovia
	GK	Emil Goerlitz	13 June 1903 (aged 20)	1	(Poland) 1. FC Kattowitz
	FW	Józef Kałuża	11 February 1896 (aged 28)	5	(Poland) Cracovia
	MF	Władysław Krupa	29 December 1899 (aged 24)	1	(Poland) Wisła Kraków
	MF	Wacław Kuchar	16 September 1897 (aged 26)	8	(Poland) Pogoń Lwów
	GK	Jan Loth	31 August 1900 (aged 23)	3	(Poland) Polonia Warsaw
	FW	Juliusz Miller	16 July 1895 (aged 28)	4	(Poland) Czarni Lwów
	GK	Stefan Popiel	19 May 1896 (aged 28)	2	(Poland) Cracovia
	FW	Henryk Reyman	28 July 1897 (aged 26)	3	(Poland) Wisła Kraków
	FW	Jan Reyman	22 October 1902 (aged 21)	0	(Poland) Cracovia
	FW	Leon Sperling	7 August 1900 (aged 23)	8	(Poland) Cracovia
	MF	Marian Spoida	4 January 1901 (aged 23)	6	(Poland) Warta Poznań
	FW	Wawrzyniec Staliński	5 February 1899 (aged 25)	5	(Poland) Warta Poznań
	MF	Zdzisław Styczeń	16 October 1894 (aged 29)	3	(Poland) Cracovia
	MF	Tadeusz Synowiec	11 November 1889 (aged 34)	8	(Poland) Cracovia
	GK	Mieczysław Wiśniewski	23 November 1892 (aged 31)	5	(Poland) Wisła Kraków
	DF	Marian Markiewicz	8 December 1895 (aged 28)	5	(Poland) Wisła Kraków

== Romania ==
Head coach: (Romania) Adrian Suciu

No.	Pos.	Player	Date of birth (age)	Caps	Club
	DF	Iosif Bartha	18 July 1902 (aged 21)		(Romania) Stăruința Oradea
	FW	Nicolae Bonciocat	13 April 1898 (aged 26)		(Romania) Universitatea Cluj
	FW	Carol Frech	1896		(Romania) Chinezul Timişoara
	FW	Aurel Guga	10 August 1898 (aged 25)		(Romania) Universitatea Cluj
	DF	Elemer Hirsch	14 May 1895 (aged 29)		(Romania) Universitatea Cluj
	FW	Iacob Holz	1901		(Romania) Unirea Timişoara
	MF	Nicolae Hönigsberg	28 August 1901 (aged 22)		(Romania) CA Oradea
	MF	Dezideriu Jacobi (Dezsö Jakobi)	23 March 1900 (aged 24)		(Romania) Haggibor Cluj
	MF	Alexandru Kozovits	3 September 1899 (aged 24)		(Romania) CA Timişoara
	GK	Pompeiu Lazăr	1906		(Romania) Universitatea Cluj
	DF	Attila Molnár	2 February 1898 (aged 26)		(Romania) Mureşul Târgu Mureş
	MF	Radu Niculescu			(Romania) Mureşul Târgu Mureş
	DF	Atanasie Protopopesco	8 April 1900 (aged 24)		(Romania) Tricolor Bucuresti
	GK	Adalbert Ritter	29 April 1900 (aged 24)		(Romania) Chinezul Timişoara
	FW	Francisc Rónnay	29 April 1900 (aged 24)		(Romania) CA Oradea
	FW	Augustin Semler	1904		(Romania) Chinezul Timişoara
	FW	Adalbert Ströck	12 February 1903 (aged 21)		(Romania) Stăruința Oradea
	GK	Ştefan (István) Ströck	11 January 1901 (aged 23)		(Romania) CA Oradea
	FW	Mihai Tänzer	7 February 1905 (aged 19)		(Romania) Chinezul Timişoara
	MF	Leopold Tritsch	22 February 1901 (aged 23)		(Romania) Brașovia Brașov
	FW	Rudolf Wetzer	17 March 1901 (aged 23)		(Romania) Unirea Timişoara
	MF	Francisc Zimmermann	1 June 1900 (aged 23)		(Romania) CA Timişoara

== Spain ==
Head coach: (Spain) Pedro Parages

No.	Pos.	Player	Date of birth (age)	Caps	Club
	MF	José María Belauste	3 September 1889 (aged 34)		(Spain) Athletic Bilbao
	FW	Marcelino Agirrezabala	29 March 1902 (aged 22)		(Spain) Athletic Bilbao
	FW	Gerónimo del Campo	30 September 1902 (aged 21)		(Spain) Real Madrid CF
	MF	Domingo Carulla	25 October 1903 (aged 20)		(Spain) FC Barcelona
	DF	Patricio Escobal	24 August 1903 (aged 20)		(Spain) Real Madrid CF
	MF	Francisco Gamborena	14 March 1901 (aged 23)		(Spain) Real Unión
	GK	Óscar Álvarez	1 May 1902 (aged 22)		(Spain) Real Stadium Club Ovetense
	FW	Carmelo Goyenechea	18 June 1898 (aged 25)		(Spain) Athletic Bilbao
	MF	Antonio Juantegui	4 April 1898 (aged 26)		(Spain) Real Sociedad
	MF	Jesús Larraza	20 July 1903 (aged 20)		(Spain) Athletic Bilbao
	FW	Juan Monjardín	24 April 1903 (aged 21)		(Spain) Real Madrid CF
	DF	Luis Casas Pasarín	16 April 1902 (aged 22)		(Spain) Celta de Vigo
	MF	José María Peña	19 April 1895 (aged 29)		(Spain) Arenas Club de Getxo
	FW	Vicente Piera	11 June 1903 (aged 20)		(Spain) FC Barcelona
	FW	Félix Pérez Marcos	13 June 1901 (aged 22)		(Spain) Real Madrid CF
	MF	Josep Samitier	2 February 1902 (aged 22)		(Spain) FC Barcelona
	MF	Monchín Triana	28 June 1902 (aged 21)		(Spain) Atlético Madrid
	DF	Pedro Vallana	29 November 1897 (aged 26)		(Spain) Arenas Club de Getxo
	FW	José Luis Zabala	15 December 1898 (aged 25)		(Spain) RCD Espanyol
	GK	Ricardo Zamora	21 January 1901 (aged 23)		(Spain) RCD Espanyol
	MF	Manuel Meana	21 October 1901 (aged 22)		(Spain) Real Sporting

== Sweden ==
Head coach: (Hungary) József Nagy

No.	Pos.	Player	Date of birth (age)	Caps	Club
	DF	Axel "Massa" Alfredsson	2 May 1902 (aged 22)	0	(Sweden) Hälsingborgs IF
	FW	Charles "Bromme" Brommesson	12 August 1903 (aged 20)	2	(Sweden) Hälsingborgs IF
	MF	Gustaf "Gurra" Carlson (Carlsson)	22 July 1894 (aged 29)	9	(Sweden) Mariebergs IK
	FW	Albin Dahl	2 January 1900 (aged 24)	15	(Sweden) Hälsingborgs IF
	MF	Sven Friberg	7 February 1895 (aged 29)	23	(Sweden) Örgryte IS
	MF	Karl "Köping" Gustafsson	16 September 1888 (aged 35)	31	(Sweden) Djurgårdens IF
	DF	Fritjof "Fritte" Hillén	19 May 1893 (aged 31)	8	(Sweden) GAIS
	DF	Konrad Hirsch	19 May 1900 (aged 24)	1	(Sweden) GAIS
	MF	Gunnar "Bajadären" Holmberg	6 May 1897 (aged 27)	3	(Sweden) GAIS
	FW	Per "Pära" Kaufeldt	1 August 1902 (aged 21)	5	(Sweden) AIK
	FW	Tore Keller	4 January 1905 (aged 19)	0	(Sweden) IK Sleipner
	FW	Rudolf "Putte" Kock	29 June 1901 (aged 22)	22	(Sweden) AIK
	GK	Sigfrid "Sigge" Lindberg	26 March 1897 (aged 27)	14	(Sweden) Hälsingborgs IF
	FW	Vigor "Kuta" Lindberg	26 April 1899 (aged 25)	1	(Sweden) IK Sleipner
	MF	Sven "Linkan" Lindqvist	26 March 1903 (aged 21)	1	(Sweden) AIK
	FW	Evert "Lunkan" Lundqvist	27 February 1900 (aged 24)	0	(Sweden) Örgryte IS
	DF	Sten Mellgren	28 August 1900 (aged 23)	1	(Sweden) IFK Stockholm
	FW	Gunnar "Lill-Gunnar" Olsson	27 March 1901 (aged 23)	4	(Sweden) Hälsingborgs IF
	FW	Sven "Trollgubben" Rydell	14 January 1905 (aged 19)	3	(Sweden) Örgryte IS
	MF	Harry Sundberg	9 January 1898 (aged 26)	4	(Sweden) Djurgårdens IF
	FW	Thorsten Svensson	8 October 1901 (aged 22)	1	(Sweden) GAIS
	GK	Robert Zander	18 September 1895 (aged 28)	15	(Sweden) Örgryte IS

== Switzerland ==
Head coach: (England) Edward Duckworth

No.	Pos.	Player	Date of birth (age)	Caps	Club
	FW	Max Abegglen	11 April 1902 (aged 22)		(Switzerland) Grasshopper Club Zürich
	FW	Félix Bédouret	1897		(Switzerland) Servette FC
	DF	Charles Bouvier	24 August 1898 (aged 25)		(Switzerland) Servette FC
	MF	Walter Dietrich	24 December 1902 (aged 21)		(Switzerland) Servette FC
	FW	Karl Ehrenbolger	13 November 1899 (aged 24)		(Switzerland) FC Nordstern Basel
	DF	Paul Fässler	13 June 1901 (aged 22)		(Switzerland) BSC Young Boys
	DF	Gustav Gottenkieny	8 May 1896 (aged 28)		(Switzerland) Grasshopper Club Zürich
	MF	Jean Haag			(Switzerland) Grasshopper Club Zürich
	FW	Marcel Katz			(Switzerland) BSC Old Boys
	FW	Edmond Kramer	8 December 1906 (aged 17)		(Switzerland) FC Cantonal Neuchâtel
	MF	Adolphe Mengotti	12 November 1901 (aged 22)		(Spain) Real Madrid CF
	MF	August Oberhauser	4 March 1895 (aged 29)		(Switzerland) FC Nordstern Basel
	FW	Robert Pache	26 September 1897 (aged 26)		(Switzerland) Servette FC
	DF	Aron Pollitz	11 February 1896 (aged 28)		(Switzerland) BSC Old Boys
	GK	Hans Pulver	28 December 1902 (aged 21)		(Switzerland) BSC Young Boys
	DF	Rudolf Ramseyer	17 September 1897 (aged 26)		(Switzerland) BSC Young Boys
	DF	Adolphe Reymond	4 September 1896 (aged 27)		(Switzerland) Servette FC
	DF	Louis Richard			(Switzerland) Servette FC
	GK	Theo Schär			(Switzerland) Servette FC
	MF	Paul Schmiedlin	2 June 1897 (aged 26)		(Switzerland) FC Bern
	FW	Paul Sturzenegger	7 June 1902 (aged 21)		(Switzerland) F.C. Zürich
	DF	Walter Weiler	4 December 1903 (aged 20)		(Switzerland) SC Veltheim

== Turkey ==
Head coach: (Scotland) Billy Hunter

No.	Pos.	Player	Date of birth (age)	Caps	Club
1	GK	Nedim Kaleci	1900	1 (0)	(Turkey) Altınordu İdman Yurdu
2	DF	Cafer Çağatay	1 January 1899 (aged 25)	1 (0)	(Turkey) Fenerbahçe S.K.
3	DF	Ali Gençay	2 February 1905 (aged 19)	0 (0)	(Turkey) Galatasaray S.K.
4	MF	Kadri Göktulga	1904	0 (0)	(Turkey) Fenerbahçe S.K.
5	MF	İsmet Uluğ	1901	1 (0)	(Turkey) Fenerbahçe S.K.
6	MF	Nihat Bekdik	1902	1 (0)	(Turkey) Galatasaray S.K.
7	FW	Mehmet Leblebi	1908	0 (0)	(Turkey) Galatasaray S.K.
8	FW	Alaattin Baydar	1901	1 (0)	(Turkey) Fenerbahçe S.K.
9	FW	Zeki Rıza Sporel	28 February 1898 (aged 26)	1 (2)	(Turkey) Fenerbahçe S.K.
10	FW	Bekir Refet	22 May 1899 (aged 25)	0 (0)	(Germany) Phönix Karlsruhe
11	FW	Bedri Gürsoy	1904	1 (0)	(Turkey) Fenerbahçe S.K.
12	GK	Hamit Akbay	1900	0 (0)	(Turkey) Küçükçekmece S.K.
13	FW	Kamil Rona	1894	0 (0)	(Turkey) Muhafızgücü
15	MF	Hamit Arslan	1894	0 (0)	(Turkey) Altay S.K.
16	MF	Kemal Rıfat Kalpakçıoğlu	1899	0 (0)	(Turkey) Galatasaray S.K.
17	FW	Sabih Arca	1 January 1901 (aged 23)	1 (0)	(Turkey) Fenerbahçe S.K.
18	MF	İbrahim Kelle	1897	1 (0)	(Turkey) Altınordu İdman Yurdu
19	DF	Kemal Ruhi			(Turkey)
20	FW	Muslih Peykoğlu	20 October 1905 (aged 18)	0 (0)	(Turkey) Galatasaray S.K.
14	DF	Hamid Buranheddin			(Turkey)

== Uruguay ==
Head coach: (Uruguay) Ernesto Figoli

No.	Pos.	Player	Date of birth (age)	Caps	Club
1	GK	Andrés Mazali	22 July 1902 (aged 21)		(Uruguay) Nacional
2	DF	José Nasazzi (c)	24 May 1901 (aged 23)		(Uruguay) Bella Vista
3	DF	Pedro Arispe	30 September 1900 (aged 23)		(Uruguay) Rampla Juniors
17	MF	Humberto Tomasina	12 September 1898 (aged 25)		(Uruguay) Liverpool
4	MF	José Leandro Andrade	22 November 1901 (aged 22)		(Uruguay) Bella Vista
7	MF	José Vidal	15 December 1896 (aged 27)		(Uruguay) Belgrano
5	MF	Alfredo Zibechi	30 October 1895 (aged 28)		(Uruguay) Nacional
6	MF	Alfredo Ghierra	31 August 1891 (aged 32)		(Uruguay) Universal
13	FW	Santos Urdinarán	30 March 1900 (aged 24)		(Uruguay) Nacional
15	FW	José Naya	25 July 1896 (aged 27)		(Uruguay) Liverpool
8	FW	Héctor Scarone	26 November 1898 (aged 25)		(Uruguay) Nacional
9	FW	Pedro Petrone	11 May 1905 (aged 19)		(Uruguay) Charley Football Club
10	FW	Pedro Cea	1 September 1900 (aged 23)		(Uruguay) Lito
11	FW	Ángel Romano	2 August 1894 (aged 29)		(Uruguay) Nacional
12	GK	Pedro Casella	31 October 1898 (aged 25)		(Uruguay) Belgrano
22	FW	Leonidas Chiappara			(Uruguay) River Plate F.C.
18	FW	Pedro Etchegoyen			(Uruguay) Liverpool
21	FW	Zoilo Saldombide	18 March 1905 (aged 19)		(Uruguay) Montevideo Wanderers
20	FW	Pascual Somma	7 February 1891 (aged 33)		(Uruguay) Nacional
14	DF	Antonio Urdinarán	30 October 1898 (aged 25)		(Uruguay) Nacional
16	DF	Fermín Uriarte	1902		(Uruguay) Lito
19	MF	Pedro Zingone	1899		(Uruguay) Lito

== United States ==
Head coach: George Burford

No.	Pos.	Player	Date of birth (age)	Caps	Club
	FW	Aage Brix	9 December 1894 (aged 29)		(United States) Los Angeles Athletic Club
	FW	Sam Dalrymple	22 December 1901 (aged 22)		(United States) Disston A.A.
	DF	Irving Davis	12 December 1896 (aged 27)		(United States) Fairhill FC, Philadelphia
	MF	William Demko	20 December 1895 (aged 28)		(United States) Fleisher Yarn
	GK	Jimmy Douglas	12 January 1898 (aged 26)		(United States) Newark Skeeters
	FW	Henry Farrell	2 October 1902 (aged 21)		(United States) Fairhill FC, Philadelphia
	FW	William Findlay	15 January 1904 (aged 20)		(United States) Galicia FC, New York
	FW	Edward Hart	28 January 1903 (aged 21)		(United States) St. Matthews F.C.
	MF	Raymond Hornberger	23 December 1898 (aged 25)		(United States) Disston A.A.
	MF	Carl Johnson	18 September 1892 (aged 31)		(United States) Swedish-American FC, Chicago
	MF	Frank Burkhardt "Burke" Jones	25 April 1903 (aged 21)		(United States) Bridgeville FC, Pittsburgh
	DF	Jakes Mulholland	2 October 1901 (aged 22)		(United States) Scott A.A.
	DF	Fred O'Connor	7 April 1892 (aged 32)		(United States) Lynn General Electric, Massachusetts
	FW	James Rhody	17 July 1896 (aged 27)		(United States) Erie A.A.
	DF	Arthur Rudd	22 October 1890 (aged 33)		(United States) Fleisher Yarn
	FW	Andy Straden	27 November 1897 (aged 26)		(United States) Fleisher Yarn
	FW	Herbert Wells	4 May 1901 (aged 23)		(United States) Fleisher Yarn

== Yugoslavia ==
Head coach: (Kingdom of Yugoslavia) Todor Sekulić

No.	Pos.	Player	Date of birth (age)	Caps	Club
	DF	Dragutin Babić	5 November 1897 (aged 26)		(Kingdom of Yugoslavia) Građanski Zagreb
	FW	Stjepan Bocak	9 December 1900 (aged 23)	0	(Kingdom of Yugoslavia) Concordia Zagreb
	FW	Slavin Cindrić	10 September 1901 (aged 22)		(Kingdom of Yugoslavia) Građanski Zagreb
	DF	Eugen Dasović	1 December 1896 (aged 27)		(Kingdom of Yugoslavia) HAŠK Zagreb
	MF	Artur Dubravčić	15 September 1894 (aged 29)		(Kingdom of Yugoslavia) Concordia Zagreb
	GK	Dragutin Friedrich	5 January 1897 (aged 27)		(Kingdom of Yugoslavia) HAŠK Zagreb
	FW	Dragan Jovanović	29 September 1903 (aged 20)		(Kingdom of Yugoslavia) Jugoslavija Belgrade
	DF	Andrija Kujundžić	29 November 1899 (aged 24)		(Kingdom of Yugoslavia) Bačka Subotica
	DF	Marijan Marjanović	1904		(Kingdom of Yugoslavia) HAŠK Zagreb
	FW	Antun Pavleković	12 April 1899 (aged 25)		(Kingdom of Yugoslavia) Građanski Zagreb
	DF	Alfons Pažur	13 March 1896 (aged 28)		(Kingdom of Yugoslavia) Concordia Zagreb
	FW	Adolf Percl	16 March 1900 (aged 24)		(Kingdom of Yugoslavia) Concordia Zagreb
	FW	Emil Perška	20 June 1896 (aged 27)		(Kingdom of Yugoslavia) Građanski Zagreb
	MF	Dušan Petković	13 April 1903 (aged 21)		(Kingdom of Yugoslavia) Jugoslavija Belgrade
	FW	Emil Plazzeriano	3 December 1897 (aged 26)		(Kingdom of Yugoslavia) HAŠK Zagreb
	DF	Janko Rodin	9 September 1900 (aged 23)		(Kingdom of Yugoslavia) Hajduk Split
	DF	Rudolf Rupec	17 September 1895 (aged 28)		(Kingdom of Yugoslavia) Građanski Zagreb
	FW	Vladimir Vinek	15 May 1900 (aged 24)		(Kingdom of Yugoslavia) Concordia Zagreb
	MF	Dragutin Vragović	18 September 1897 (aged 26)		(Kingdom of Yugoslavia) Građanski Zagreb
	DF	Stjepan Vrbančić	29 November 1900 (aged 23)		(Kingdom of Yugoslavia) HAŠK Zagreb
	GK	Dragutin Vrđuka	3 April 1895 (aged 29)		(Kingdom of Yugoslavia) Građanski Zagreb
	FW	Branko Zinaja	28 September 1895 (aged 28)		(Kingdom of Yugoslavia) HAŠK Zagreb

== Sources ==
- Sports-reference
- FIFA
- RSSSF
- List of Luxembourgian olympic footballers at ALO
- List of Swedish medalists at the 1924 Summer Olympics, Sveriges Olympiska Kommitté
- Turkey national football team: match reports 1923-1924, Walter Verani, Erdinç Sivritepe and Turkish Soccer
- Match report at FFF
- Match report at FFF
- Match report at Serbian football federation
- Latvijas futbolisti piedalīsies Berlines Olimpiādē?, Arnolds Šmits
- Saulis, Vytautas; Gediminas Kalinauskas (1997). Lietuvos futbolas 1922–1997 (in Lithuanian). Vilnius: Diemedis. p. 11. ISBN 9986-23-034-9.
- (archive) Ireland’s footballers at the Paris Olympics, 1924
