= Lithuania at the 1924 Summer Olympics =

- IOC code: LTU
- NOC: Lithuanian National Olympic Committee

in Paris
- Competitors: 13 in 2 sports
- Medals: Gold 0 Silver 0 Bronze 0 Total 0

Summer Olympics appearances (overview)
- 1924; 1928; 1932–1988; 1992; 1996; 2000; 2004; 2008; 2012; 2016; 2020; 2024; 2028

Other related appearances
- Russian Empire (1908–1912); Soviet Union (1952–1988)

Lithuania competed at the Summer Olympic Games for the first time at the 1924 Summer Olympics in Paris, France. On the Olympic entry application, Lithuania listed seven sports but sent athletes only for football and cycling events. The Lithuanian team consisted of 13 athletes who competed in two sports. Lithuania did not win any medal in the Games.

== Background ==
The 1924 Summer Olympics marked Lithuania's first participation in the Olympic Games. After 1928, the country would not participate in the Olympic Games till the 1992 Games. The Lithuanian National Olympic Committee would be recognized by the International Olympic Committee (IOC) only in 1991.

The 1924 Summer Olympics was held in Paris, France, in July 1924. The Lithuanian delegation consisted of 13 athletes. Lithuania did not win any medal in the Games.

== Competitors ==
Lithuania sent a contingent of 13 athletes who competed in two sports at the Games. On Olympic application, Lithuania listed seven sports but sent athletes only for football and cycling events.

Sport	Men	Women	Total
Cycling	2	0	2
Football	11	0	11
Total	13	0	13

== Cycling ==
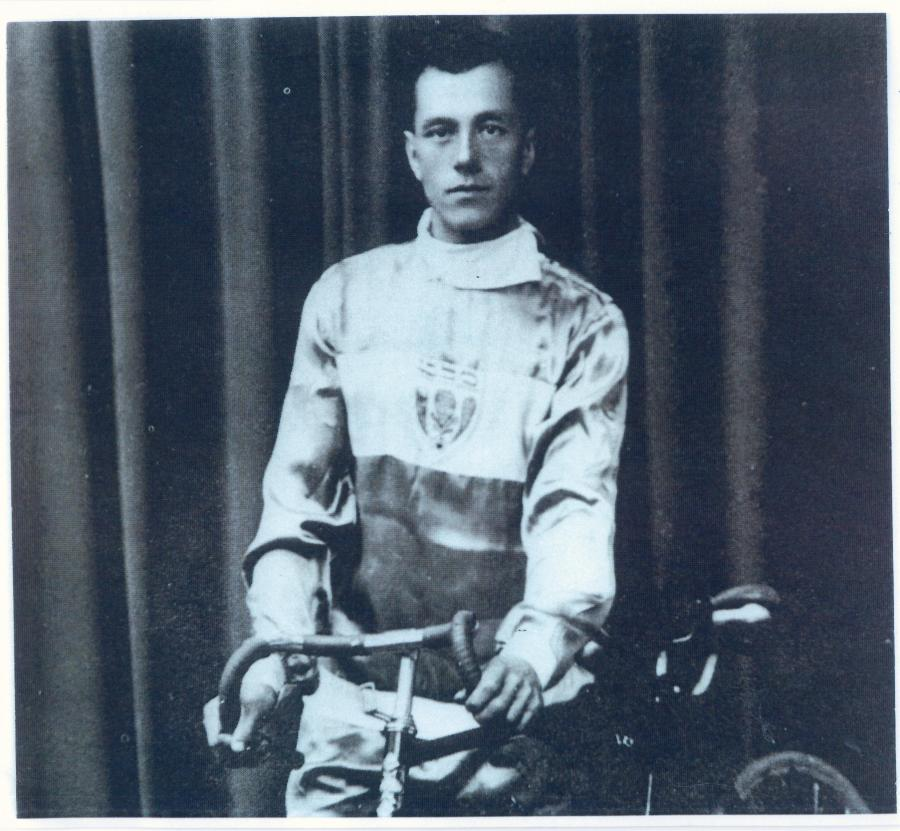
Isakas Anolikas participated in road cycling

The road race event was held at Stade Olympique de Colombes on 23 July. The riders started at two-minute intervals from the Colombes Stadium and the course consisted of a turnaround at the 94 km (58 mi) mark. Isakas Anolikas and Juozas Vilpišauskas participated in the individual time trial. Anolikas participated in 1924 and 1928 Summer Olympics for Lithuania, while this was the only participation for Vilpišauskas. On the road event over the 188 km (117 mi) course, both of them failed to finish the race due to mechanical malfunctions.

Road cycling

Athlete	Event	Result	Rank
Isakas Anolikas	Time trial	DNF	
Juozas Vilpišauskas	Time trial	DNF	

== Football ==
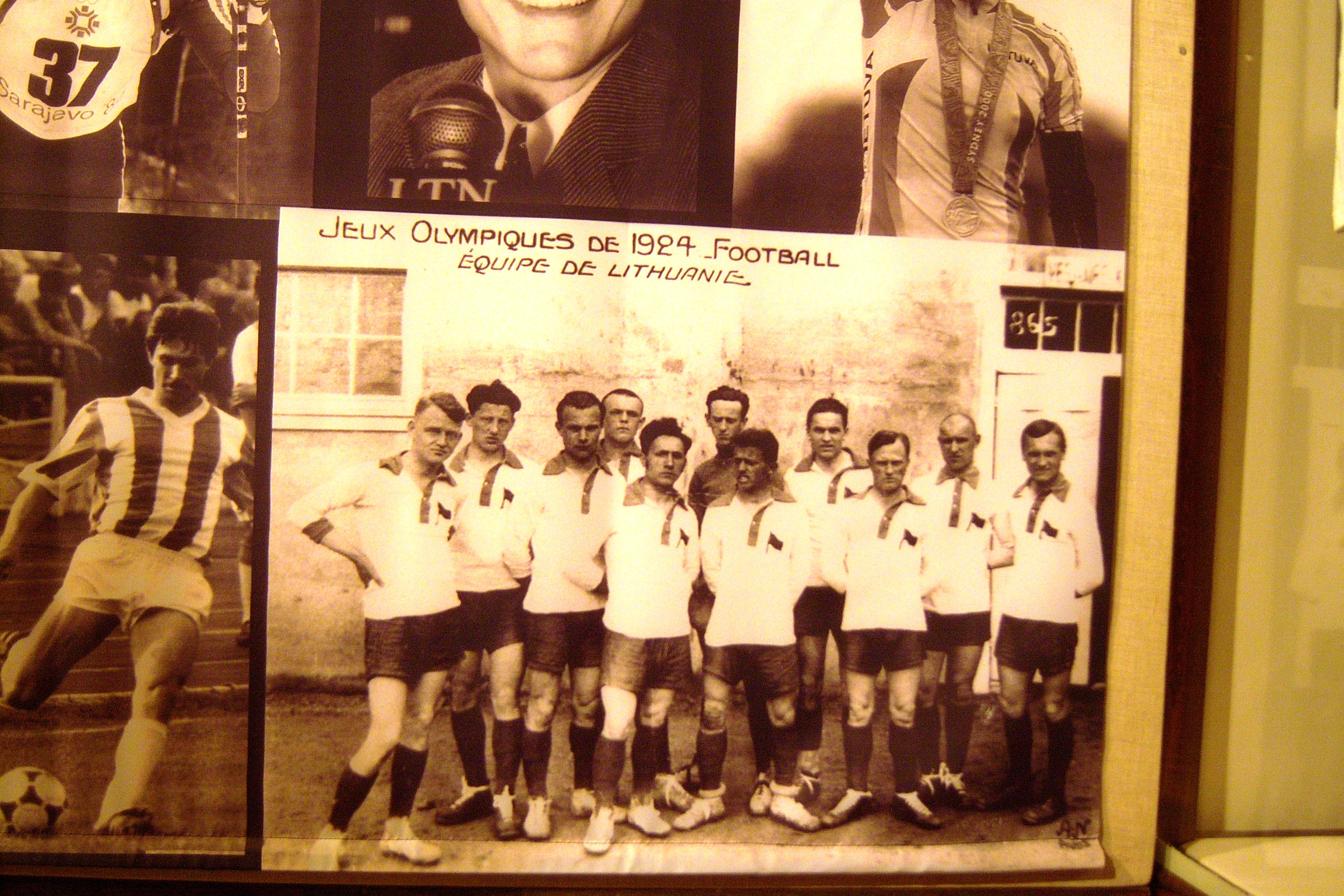
Lithuanian football team

The Lithuanian team was assembled at the last minute due to lack of funds. It lacked official documents, and professional uniforms. The hastily assembled team did not have enough training and practice before departing for the Olympics. The train journey from Kaunas to Paris took about 40 hours and athletes arrived at 2 am, only 12 hours before the first game against Switzerland. The team lost the match by nine goals, and was eliminated from further competition.

Team

- Valerijonas Balčiūnas
- Vincas Bartuška
- Steponas Garbačiauskas
- Hansas Gecas
- Jurgis Hardingsonas
- Stasys Janušauskas
- Leonas Juozapaitis
- Edvardas Mikučiauskas
- Stasys Razma
- Stasys Sabaliauskas
- Juozas Žebrauskas

Round 1

May 25, 1924
15:30

Switzerland	9–0	Lithuania
Sturzenegger 2' 43' 68' 85'; Dietrich 14'; Abegglen 41' 50' 58'; Ramseyer 63' (pen.)	Report

Stade Pershing
Attendance: 8,110
Referee: A. Scamoni (ITA)
