= Demko =

Demko (Ukrainian: Демко) is a given name and a surname of several origins (Polish, Slovak, Ukrainian/Rusyn), all being diminutives from the given names: Dymitr, Demeter (Demetrius), Demyan.

Notable people with the surname include:

- Attila Demkó (1976), Hungarian security policy expert, writer, and former diplomat
- Iwona Demko, Polish artist
- Michelle Demko (born 1973), American soccer player and coach
- Thatcher Demko (born 1995), American ice hockey player
- William Demko (1895–1957), American soccer player

== Given name ==
- Demko Makoviychuk, pen name of Sydir Vorobkevych

== See also ==
- Joseph M. Demko School, St. Albert, Alberta, Canada
