= Sloup =

Sloup may refer to:

== Places in the Czech Republic ==
- Sloup (Blansko District), a market town in the South Moravian Region
- Sloup, a village and part of Davle in the Central Bohemian Region
- Sloup v Čechách, a municipality and village in the Liberec Region
  - Sloup Castle

== People ==
- Jiří Sloup (1953–2017), Czech footballer

== See also ==
- Josef Sloup-Štaplík (1897–1952), Czech footballer
- Rudolf Sloup-Štapl (1895–1936), Czech footballer
