= Hajós (disambiguation) =

Hajós is a town in Bács-Kiskun County, Hungary.

Hajós may also refer to:

== Other uses ==
- 151242 Hajós, a minor planet named after Alfréd Hajós
- Alfréd Hajós National Swimming Stadium, aquatics complex in Budapest, Hungary
- Hajós construction, a binary graph operation named after György Hajós

== See also ==
- Hajós (surname), multiple people
