= 1921 Lithuanian Athletics Championships =

The 1st 1921 Lithuanian Athletics Championships were held in Kaunas on 30–31 July 1921. In the first of the championships only men competed.

== Winners ==
- 60 m: Steponas Garbačiauskas : 7.6 (NR)
- 200 m: Steponas Garbačiauskas : 25.2 (NR)
- 5000 m: L.Juozapaitis : 18:30.0 (NR)
- Long jump: V.Vokietaisi : 5 m (NR)
- Pole vault : E. Fersteris : 2.40
- Discus throw: I. Teršerskis 29.02 (NR)
- Javelin throw: Dargužas : 40.57 (NR)
- Hammer throw: Kęstutis Bulota: 17,86 (NR)
- Triple jump: Kęstutis Bulota: 10.5 (NR)
- Shot put : I. Teršerskis : 9,90 m (NR)
- 4 × 100 m : ?? : ??
