= Geca =

Geca can refer to:

- Gilroy Early College Academy, abbreviated as GECA.
- Geča, a municipality in Slovakia.
- Geca Kon (1873–1941), Serbian book publisher
- Nudžein Geca (born 1966), Bosnian footballer
- Government College of Engineering, Aurangabad (established in 1960), a college in Maharashtra, India

== See also ==
- Hansas Gecas, Lithuanian footballer
