= Pavel Mahrer =

Czech footballer

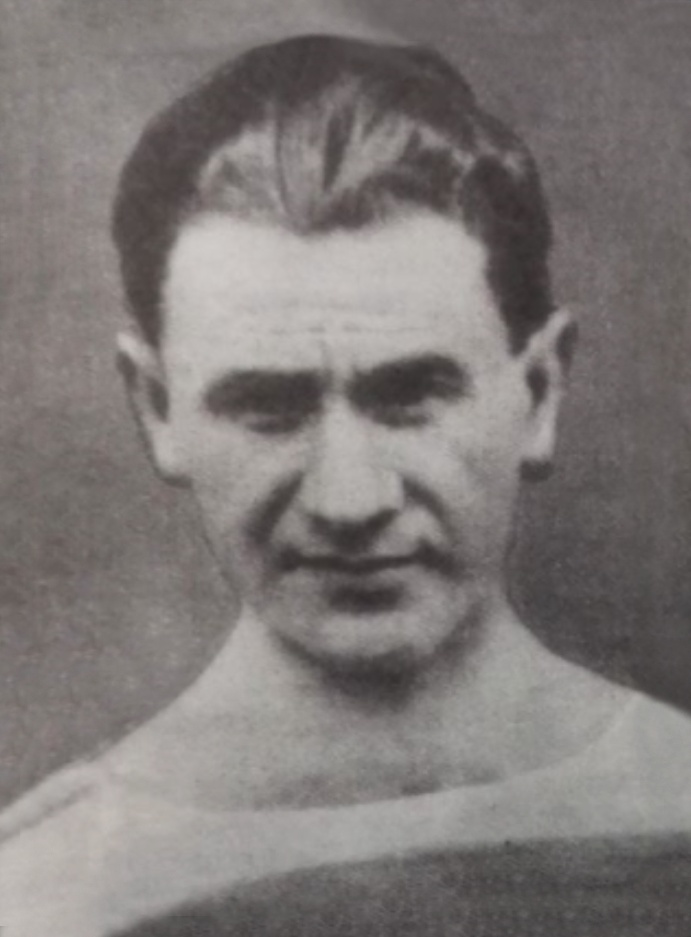

Personal information
- Date of birth: 23 May 1900
- Place of birth: Teplice, Bohemia
- Date of death: 18 December 1985 (aged 85)
- Place of death: United States
- Position: Wing half

Senior career*
| Years | Team | Apps | (Gls) |
- Teplitzer FK
| 1923–1926 | DFC Prag | | |
| 1926–1927 | Brooklyn Wanderers | 17 | (0) |
| 1928–1931 | Hakoah All Stars | 127 | (4) |
| 1932–1933 | Teplitzer FK | | |
| 1933–1936 | DFC Prag | | |

International career
| 1923–1926 | Czechoslovakia | 6 | (0) |
- * Club domestic league appearances and goals

Pavel Mahrer (or Paul Mahrer, 23 May 1900 – 18 December 1985) was a Czech football midfielder of German-Jewish ethnicity who played at the 1924 Summer Olympics. Bank clerk and merchant by occupation, Mahrer played professionally in Czechoslovakia and the United States.

== Club career ==
Mahrer began his career with Teplitzer FK. In 1923, he joined DFC Prag before moving to the United States in 1926 to sign with the Brooklyn Wanderers of the American Soccer League. He returned to Czechoslovakia after the season, but was back in the United States in December 1928. At that time, he joined the Hakoah All Stars in the Eastern Professional Soccer League. In 1929, Hakoah moved to the American Soccer League, where Mahrer played until the fall of 1931. In 1932, he returned to Czechoslovakia to sign with Teplitzer FK. In 1933, he moved to DFC Prag, where he finished his career in 1936. After the German occupation of the Sudetenland, he was imprisoned at the Theresienstadt concentration camp on account of his Jewish ethnicity. He survived World War II and died in 1985 in the United States.

== International ==
Mahrer earned six caps with the Czechoslovakia national football team between 1923 and 1926. In 1924, he played two games for the Czechoslovak Olympic football team at the 1924 Summer Olympics.
