= Elena Kubiliūnaitė =

Lithuanian athletics competitor and sports journalist

Elena Kubiliūnaitė-Garbačiauskienė
- Born: 14 September 1900; Švedukalnis, Skapiškis District, Russian Empire
- Died: 19 April 1997 (aged 96); Zürich, Switzerland
- Occupations: Athlete, sports journalist
- Spouse: Steponas Garbačiauskas
- Children: Rita Garbačiauskaitė

Elena Kubiliūnaitė-Garbačiauskienė (14 September 1900 – 19 April 1997) was a Lithuanian athlete, sports journalist, one of the women's sports pioneers in Lithuania. She was one of the first tennis, basketball, athletics organizers and participants. Elena previously held Lithuanian 60 meters running, 200 meters running, long jump, high jump and shot put records.

== Biography ==
During World War I she moved to Russia and later lived in Central Asia and The Crimea. In 1920 she returned to Kaunas, Lithuania.

In 1922–1926 Elena worked at the Ministry of Education, 1928–1931 – Vytautas Magnus University library. In 1922 she edited the first Lithuanian sports magazine, Lietuvos sportas.

In 1920 she was one of the Lietuvos Fizinio Lavinimo Sąjunga (English: Lithuanian Physical Education Union), in 1922 – Lietuvos sporto lyga (English: Lithuanian Sports League) founders, serving as the organization's secretary. She was also Lietuvos moterų sporto lyga (English: Lithuanian Women's Sports League) Committee Head. In 1931, with her husband, she moved to Zürich.

Elena Kubiliūnaitė-Garbačiauskienė was buried at Petrašiūnai Cemetery.
