= Hajós (surname) =

Hajós is a Hungarian surname. Notable people with the surname include:

- Alfréd Hajós (1878–1955), Hungarian swimmer, football (soccer) player, referee, manager, and career architect
- András Hajós (born 1969), Hungarian sociologist, singer, songwriter, comedian
- Árpád Hajós (1902–1971), Hungarian footballer
- György Hajós (1912–1972), Hungarian mathematician
- Henrik Hajós (1886–1963), Hungarian freestyle swimmer
