= Maurice Droessart =

Luxembourgish footballer

Personal information
- Full name: Maurice Droessart
- Date of birth: 24 August 1896
- Position: Goalkeeper

Senior career*
Years	Team	Apps	(Gls)
- Red Boys Differdange

International career
1927	Luxembourg	1	(0)
- * Club domestic league appearances and goals

Maurice Droessart (born 24 August 1896, date of death unknown) was a Luxembourgish footballer who played as a goalkeeper and made one appearance for the Luxembourg national team.

== Career ==
Droessart played for the club Red Boys Differdange in the 1920s. He was included in Luxembourg's football squad for the 1924 Summer Olympics held in Paris. However, he did not appear in the tournament, as Étienne Bausch started in the team's first match in which they were eliminated by Italy. Droessart later earned his first and only cap for Luxembourg on 13 February 1927 in a friendly match against France B. The away match, which took place in Lyon, finished as a 2–5 loss.

== Career statistics ==
=== International ===
Luxembourg
Year	Apps	Goals
1927	1	0
Total	1	0
