= Gustavas Gvildys =

Lithuanian footballer

Personal information
- Date of birth: 31 October 1901
- Place of birth: Memel, Russian Empire
- Date of death: February 1945 (age 44)
- Place of death: Königsberg, Germany
- Position: Defender

International career
Years	Team	Apps	(Gls)
1923–1932	Lithuania	8	(0)

Gustavas Gvildys (31 October 1901 – February 1945) was a Lithuanian footballer. He played in eight matches for the Lithuania national football team from 1923 to 1932. He was also part of Lithuania's squad for the football tournament at the 1924 Summer Olympics, but he did not play in any matches.
