= Albert Stirn =

Luxembourgish footballer

Personal information
- Date of birth: 13 September 1903
- Date of death: 17 May 1945 (aged 41)

International career
Years	Team	Apps	(Gls)
1924	Luxembourg	2	(0)

Albert Stirn (13 September 1903 – 17 May 1945) was a Luxembourgish footballer. He played in two matches for the Luxembourg national football team in 1924.
