= Robert Dufour =

French footballer (1901–1933)

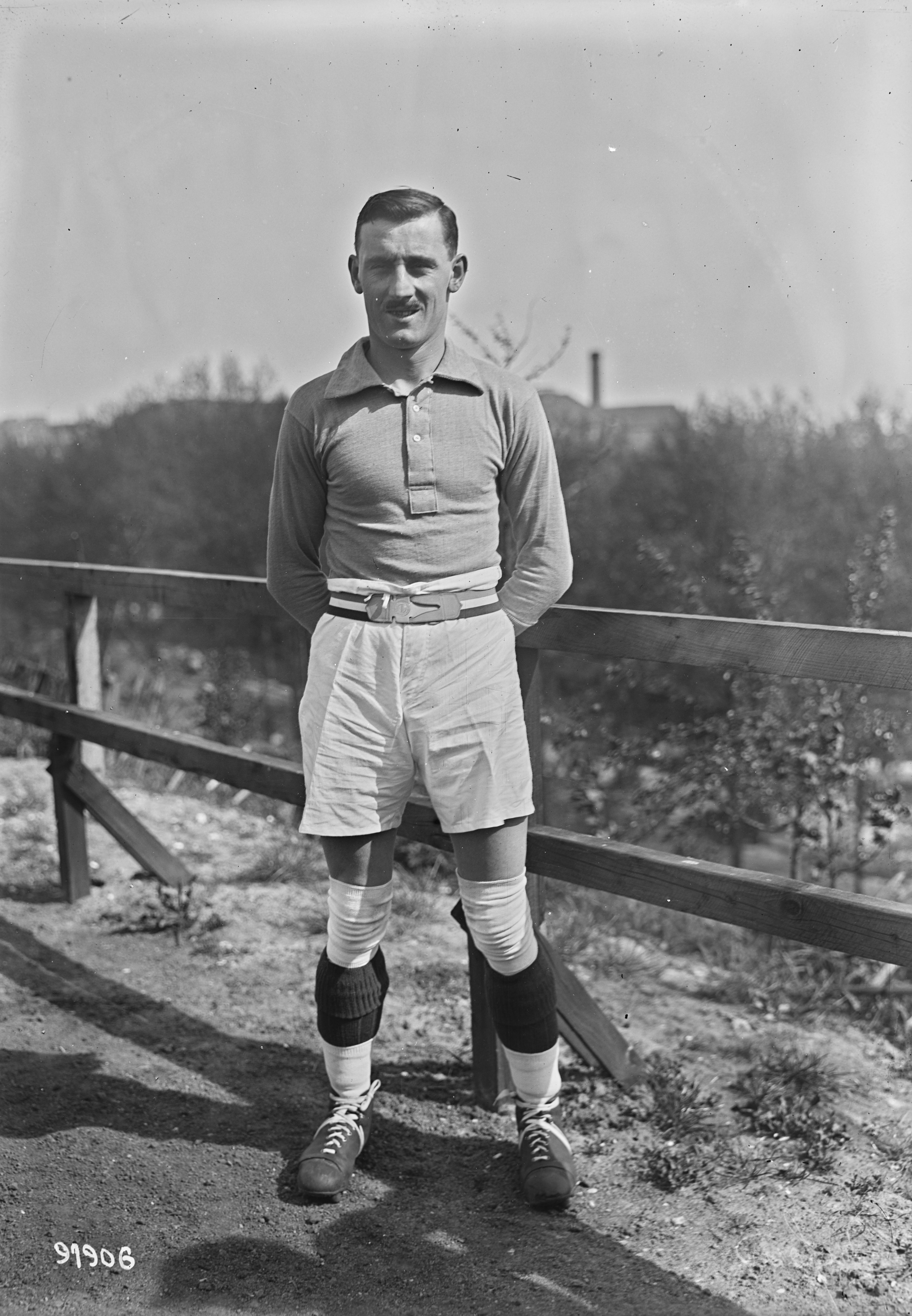
- Dufour 1924

Personal information
- Date of birth: 16 August 1901
- Date of death: 20 December 1933 (aged 32)

International career
Years	Team	Apps	(Gls)
1924	France	1	(0)

Robert Dufour (16 August 1901 – 20 December 1933) was a French footballer. He played in one match for the France national football team in 1924.
