= Nedim Kaleci =

Turkish footballer

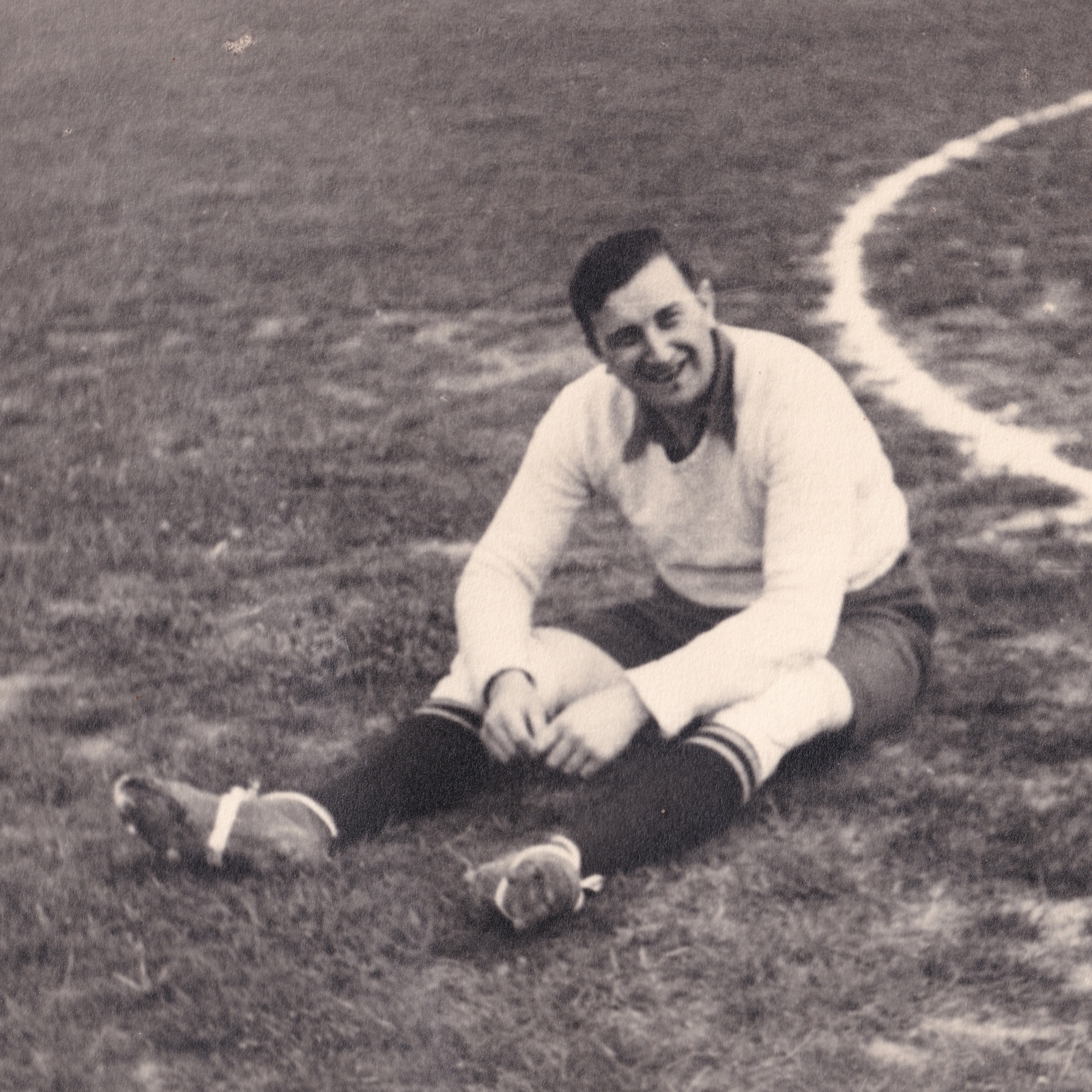

Personal information
- Date of birth: 1900
- Place of birth: Istanbul, Turkey
- Date of death: 22 July 1981 (aged 80–81)
- Position: Goalkeeper

Senior career*
Years	Team	Apps	(Gls)
1919–1926	Altınordu İdman Yurdu		
1926–1931	Fenerbahçe		

International career
1923–1925	Turkey	5	(0)
- * Club domestic league appearances and goals

Nedim Kaleci (1900 – 22 July 1981) was a Turkish footballer. He competed in the men's tournament at the 1924 Summer Olympics.
