= Attila Demkó =

Hungarian diplomat and writer (b. 1976)

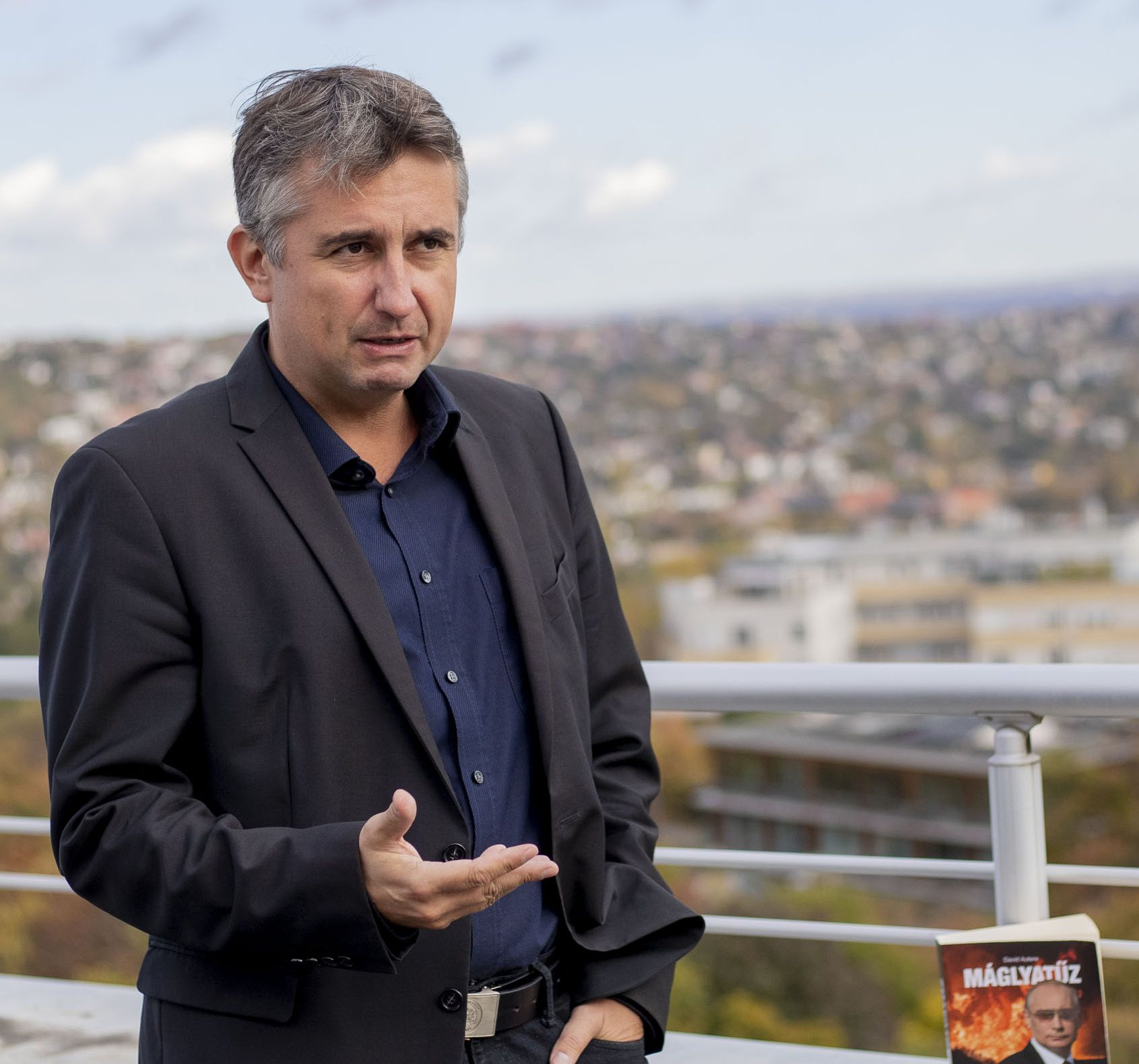
Attila Demkó in Budapest in 2018

Attila Demkó (Budapest, 31 July 1976) is a Hungarian security policy expert, and writer (under the pen name David Autere). and former diplomat. After the Russian invasion of Ukraine in February 2022 he became one of the frequently quoted experts of the topic in the international and local media.

== Education ==
Demkó holds an MA and PhD degree in history and an MA degree in political science from Eötvös Loránd University of Budapest. His PhD thesis covered the strategies of Northern Ireland's Irish national movements. Besides his university studies, he attended additional education in defence and security policy at the Manfred Woerner Foundation (1998-1999) and the Geneva Centre for Security Policy (2004-2005).

== Career ==
Demkó started his career as a political advisor at the Security and Defence Policy Secretariat of the Hungarian Prime Minister's Cabinet Office in 1999. Between 2002 and 2010, he worked as a desk officer in the Defence Policy Department of the Ministry of Defence of Hungary. From 2010 to 2012, he held the position of Head of department in the Defence Planning Department in the Ministry of Defence of Hungary. Between 2012 and 2014, he led the Defence Policy Division at the Permanent Representation of Hungary to NATO in Brussels, Belgium. From 2014 to 2018, he was the Head of Defence Policy Department in the Ministry of Defence of Hungary. As head of defence policy, among other responsibilities, he was responsible for the policy aspects of Hungarian military operations such as the one in Iraq and Afghanistan, as well as for arms control missions to the Donbas and Crimea regions of Ukraine.

=== Writer, journalist ===
Since 2018 he has worked at Mandiner, a major Hungarian daily internet news portal as a senior columnist. He covers Russia, Ukraine, and the Hungarian minorities in the neighbouring countries for Mandiner.

Under the pen name “David Autere” he is the author of the bestseller novel Máglyatűz (Bonfire) which deals with possible Russian penetration and hybrid warfare using national minorities in Central and Eastern Europe.

Demkó has talked on TV about security issues covered in his book and in his articles

The English adaptation of Máglyatűz, “The Fury of the Tsar” was introduced to the international audience in the 2019 Frankfurt Bookfair. Demkó is also the author of several dozen articles on security and defence policy issues in different Hungarian periodicals.
