= František Hojer =

Czechoslovak footballer (1896–1940)

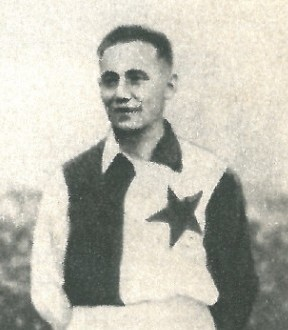

Personal information
- Date of birth: 27 April 1896
- Place of birth: Prague, Austria-Hungary
- Date of death: 16 December 1940 (aged 44)
- Position: Defender

Senior career*
| Years | Team | Apps | (Gls) |
| 1925 | Viktoria Žižkov | 5 | (1) |
| 1925–1926 | SK Slavia Prague | 13 | (9) |
| 1927–1928 | Čechie Karlín | 10 | (4) |
| 1928–1929 | SK Libeň | 3 | (0) |
| 1929–1930 | ČAFC Vinohrady | 13 | (3) |

International career
| 1923–1926 | Czechoslovakia | 5 | (0) |
- * Club domestic league appearances and goals

František Hojer (27 April 1896 – 16 December 1940) was a Czechoslovak footballer. He played 5 games for the Czechoslovakia national football team. Hojer represented Czechoslovakia at the 1924 Olympics together with his older brother Antonín.
