= Boris Bonov =

Bulgarian footballer (1900–1972)

Personal information
- Date of birth: 20 October 1900
- Date of death: 22 December 1972 (aged 72)

International career
Years	Team	Apps	(Gls)
- Bulgaria

Boris Bonov (Bulgarian: Борис Бонов; 20 October 1900 – 22 December 1972) was a Bulgarian footballer. He competed in the men's tournament at the 1924 Summer Olympics.
