= Josef Novák (footballer, born 1900) =

Czechoslovak footballer (1900–1974)

Personal information
- Date of birth: 20 October 1900
- Place of birth: Kladno, Austria-Hungary
- Date of death: 1974 (aged 73–74)

International career
| Years | Team | Apps | (Gls) |
| 1924 | Czechoslovakia | 1 | (0) |

Josef Novák (20 October 1900 – 1974) was a Czechoslovak footballer. He competed in the men's tournament at the 1924 Summer Olympics. On a club level, he played for SK Židenice.
