= Josef Pleticha =

Czechoslovak footballer

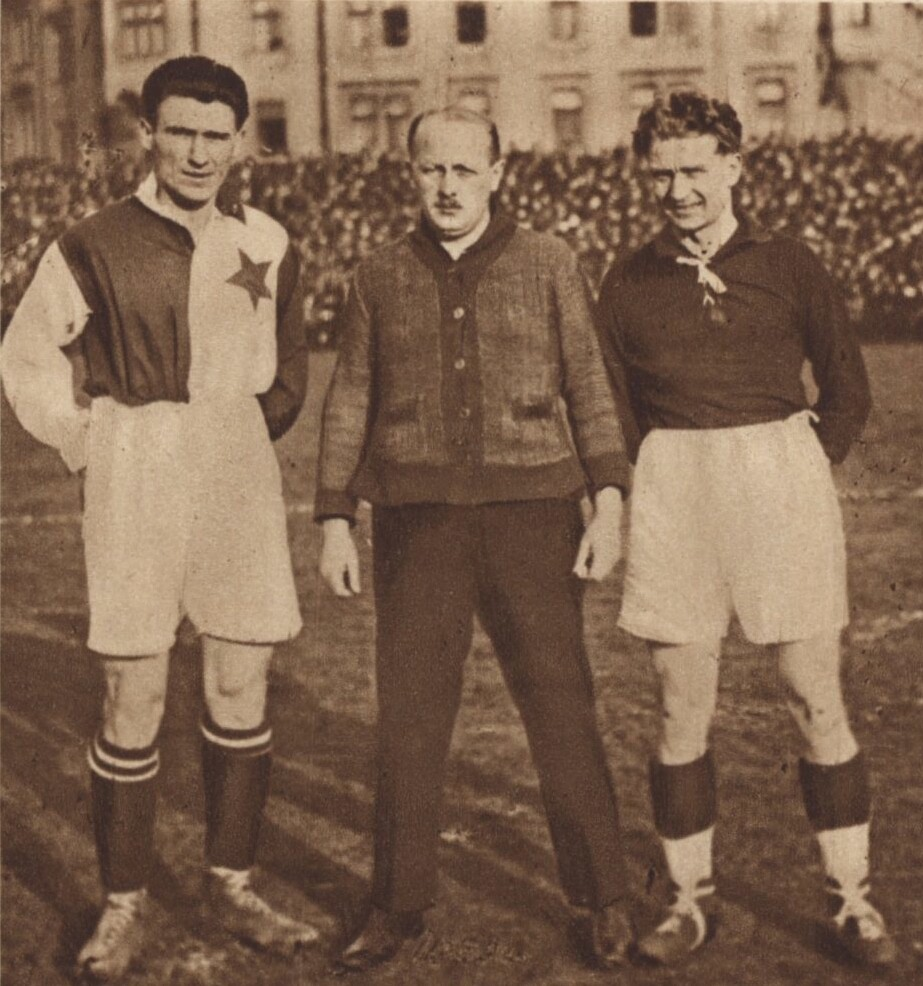
- Captain Slavia Praha Pletich and Captain Sparta Praha Karel "Kada" Pesek before the football match

Personal information
- Date of birth: 10 February 1902
- Place of birth: Kladno, Austria-Hungary
- Date of death: 6 January 1951 (aged 48)

International career
Years	Team	Apps	(Gls)
1924–1931	Czechoslovakia	9	(0)

Josef Pleticha (10 February 1902 – 6 January 1951) was a Czechoslovak footballer. He competed in the men's tournament at the 1924 Summer Olympics. At a club level, he played for SK Slavia Prague.
