= Herbert Wells (soccer) =

American soccer player

Herbert “Herb” Wells (May 4, 1901 – November 1978) was a U.S. soccer defender. Wells earned three caps with the U.S. national team in 1924. His first cap came at the 1924 Summer Olympics. Wells played the second U.S. game of the tournament, a loss to Uruguay in the quarterfinals. Following its elimination from the tournament, the U.S. played two exhibition games. Wells played both, a win over Poland and a loss to Ireland. That was his last game with the national team. At the time of the Olympics, he played for Fleisher Yarn.

He was born in Brockton, Massachusetts. He died in Exton, Pennsylvania.
