= Pauls Sokolovs =

Latvian footballer

Personal information
- Date of birth: 17 July 1902
- Place of birth: Riga, Russian Empire
- Date of death: 20 April 1971 (aged 68)
- Position: Midfielder

Senior career*
Years	Team	Apps	(Gls)
1923-1925	Torpedo Rīga		
- JKS Riga
- Rīgas FK

International career
1923-1925	Latvia	8	(0)
- * Club domestic league appearances and goals

Pauls Sokolovs (17 July 1902 – 20 April 1971) was a Latvian footballer who competed for Latvia national football team at the 1924 Summer Olympics.

Sokolovs started playing football with JKS Riga in the early years after World War I, then joined the newly founded RFK in 1923, where he played until the end of his football career. He won three Latvian Higher League titles and became a two-time winner of the Riga Football Cup between 1923 and 1928 and played 8 international matches for the Latvian national football team from 1923 to 1925, including a participation at the 1924 Summer Olympics. Sokolovs also played ice hockey, representing the Latvia national ice hockey team in several matches.

== Honours ==
- Latvian Higher League: 1924, 1925, 1926 (RFK)
- Riga Football Cup: 1924, 1925 (RFK)
