= Kārlis Ašmanis =

Latvian footballer

Personal information
- Date of birth: 14 September 1898
- Date of death: 29 November 1962 (aged 63)
- Place of death: Riga, Latvia

International career
Years	Team	Apps	(Gls)
- Latvia

Kārlis Ašmanis (6 December 1898 – 29 November 1962) was a Latvian footballer. He competed in the men's tournament at the 1924 Summer Olympics.
