= Joseph Paty =

Belgian footballer (born 1896)

Personal information
- Date of birth: 6 January 1896
- Place of birth: Liège, Belgium
- Position: Goalkeeper

Senior career*
Years	Team	Apps	(Gls)
1920–1930	Standard Liège	251	
- * Club domestic league appearances and goals

Joseph Paty (born 6 January 1896, date of death unknown) was a Belgian footballer who played as a goalkeeper.

== Career ==
Between 1920 and 1930, Paty made 251 appearances for Standard Liège. In 1924, he was called up to the Belgium national team's squad for the 1924 Summer Olympics, although did not play in any matches.

== Personal life ==
His son, André Paty, worked as a physiotherapist for Standard Liège between 1965 and 1971.
