= Juozas Vilpišauskas =

Lithuanian cyclist

Personal information
- Born: 1899

Cycling career
- Sport: Cycling

Juozas Vilpišauskas (14 December 1899 - 5 November 1987) was a Lithuanian cyclist. He competed in the individual time trial event at the 1924 Summer Olympics.
