= Émile Kolb =

Luxembourgish footballer

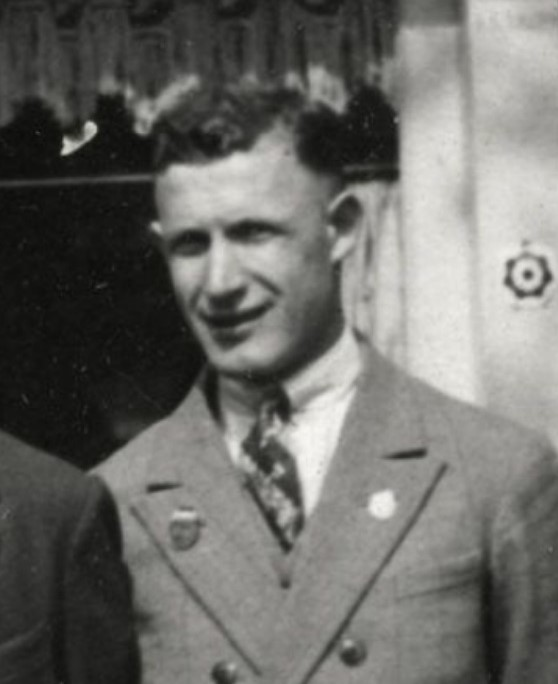
- Émile Kolb in 1928

Personal information
- Date of birth: 3 July 1902
- Place of birth: Differdange, Luxembourg
- Date of death: 1 September 1967 (aged 65)
- Place of death: Paris, France

International career
Years	Team	Apps	(Gls)
- Luxembourg

Émile Kolb (3 July 1902 – 1 September 1967) was a Luxembourgish footballer. He competed at the 1924 Summer Olympics and the 1928 Summer Olympics.
