= Arthur Ginter =

Luxembourgish footballer

Personal information
- Full name: Arthur Théodore Ginter
- Date of birth: 20 May 1898
- Place of birth: Larochette, Luxembourg
- Date of death: 15 September 1961 (aged 63)
- Place of death: Luxembourg, Luxembourg

International career
Years	Team	Apps	(Gls)
1924	Luxembourg	3	(0)

Arthur Ginter (20 May 1898 – 15 September 1961) was a Luxembourgish footballer. He played in three matches for the Luxembourg national football team in 1924.
