= Pompeiu Lazăr =

Romanian footballer

Personal information
- Date of birth: 1906
- Place of death: Unknown
- Position: Goalkeeper

Senior career*
Years	Team	Apps	(Gls)
1923–1927	Universitatea Cluj	64	(0)
1927–1928	România Cluj		

International career
1927	Romania	1	(0)
- * Club domestic league appearances and goals

Pompeiu Lazăr (born 1906, date of death unknown) was a Romanian football goalkeeper.

== International career ==
Pompeiu Lazăr played one game at international level for Romania in a 1927 friendly which ended with a 3–0 loss against Yugoslavia. He was also part of Romania's 1924 Summer Olympics squad.
