= Albert Massard =

Luxembourgish footballer

Personal information
- Date of birth: 30 August 1900
- Place of birth: Luxembourg, Luxembourg
- Date of death: 8 January 1968 (aged 67)
- Place of death: Luxembourg, Luxembourg

International career
Years	Team	Apps	(Gls)
- Luxembourg

Albert Massard (30 August 1900 – 8 January 1968) was a Luxembourgish footballer. He competed in the men's tournament at the 1924 Summer Olympics.
