= Leonas Gelermanas =

Lithuanian footballer

Personal information
- Position: Defender

International career
Years	Team	Apps	(Gls)
1925	Lithuania	1	(0)

Leonas Gelermanas was a Lithuanian footballer. He played in one match for the Lithuania national football team in 1925. He was also part of Lithuania's squad for the football tournament at the 1924 Summer Olympics, but he did not play in any matches.
