= Mathias Feller =

Luxembourgish footballer

Personal information
- Date of birth: 12 October 1904
- Date of death: 16 June 1953 (aged 48)

International career
Years	Team	Apps	(Gls)
1924-1934	Luxembourg	15	(0)

Mathias Feller (12 October 1904 – 16 June 1953) was a Luxembourgish footballer. He played in fifteen matches for the Luxembourg national football team between 1924 and 1934.
