= Isakas Anolikas =

Lithuanian cyclist (1903–1943)

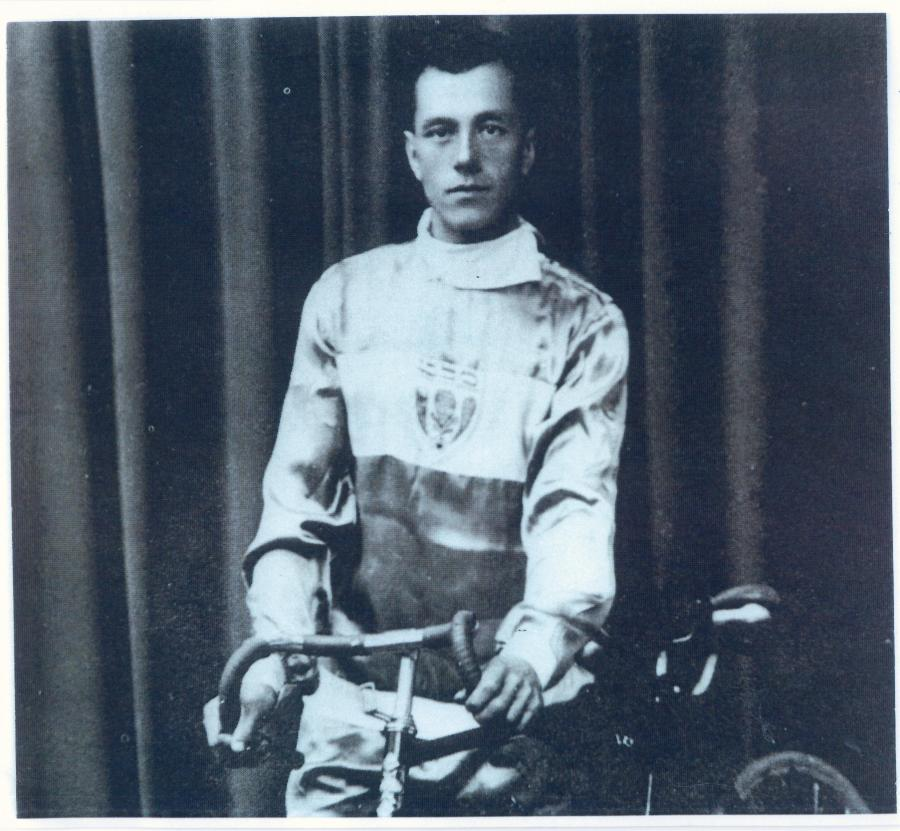

Personal information
- Born: 1903 Šiauliai, Lithuania
- Died: 1943 (aged 39–40) Kaunas, Lithuania

Cycling career
- Sport: Cycling

Isakas Anolikas (1903–1943) was a Lithuanian-born Jewish cyclist. Anolikas was part of the Makabi sport club, established in 1920. He represented Lithuania at the 1924 Summer Olympics in Paris and at the 1928 Summer Olympics in Amsterdam. Both times he did not finish the individual time trial over 188 km due to technical malfunctions. Anolikas was Lithuanian champion: in 1925 and 1926 he won individual 10 km race, in 1926 he won gold in team 70 km race. He was killed during the Holocaust because of his Jewish background. He was shot at the Ninth Fort in Kaunas.
