= Ernestas Deringas =

Lithuanian footballer

Personal information
- Date of birth: 1895
- Date of death: 7 November 1965 (aged 69–70)
- Place of death: Hamburg
- Position: Defender

International career
Years	Team	Apps	(Gls)
1923	Lithuania	1	(0)

Ernestas Deringas (1895 – 7 November 1965) was a Lithuanian footballer. He played in one match for the Lithuania national football team in 1923. He was also part of Lithuania's squad for the football tournament at the 1924 Summer Olympics, but he did not play in any matches.
