= Jean-Pierre Weber =

Luxembourgish footballer

Personal information
- Date of birth: 31 December 1899
- Place of birth: Esch-sur-Alzette, Luxembourg
- Date of death: 15 March 1967 (aged 67)
- Place of death: Esch-sur-Alzette, Luxembourg
- Position: Midfielder

International career
Years	Team	Apps	(Gls)
- Luxembourg

Jean-Pierre Weber (31 December 1899 – 15 March 1967) was a Luxembourgish footballer. He competed in the men's tournament at the 1924 Summer Olympics.
