= Jan Oosthoek =

Dutch footballer

Personal information
- Date of birth: 5 March 1898
- Place of birth: Rotterdam, Netherlands
- Date of death: 8 March 1973 (aged 75)
- Place of death: Rotterdam, Netherlands

International career
Years	Team	Apps	(Gls)
- Netherlands

Jan Oosthoek (5 March 1898 – 8 March 1973) was a Dutch footballer. He competed in the men's tournament at the 1924 Summer Olympics.
