= Paul Feierstein =

Luxembourgish footballer

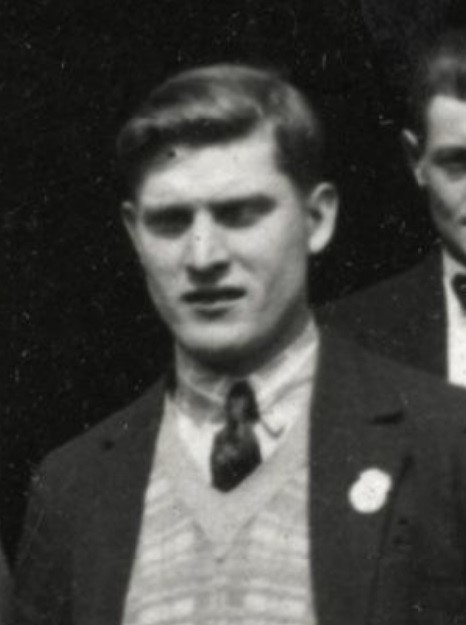
- Paul Feierstein in 1928

Personal information
- Date of birth: 27 January 1903
- Place of birth: Niederkorn, Luxembourg
- Date of death: 5 May 1963 (aged 60)
- Place of death: Dudelange, Luxembourg

International career
Years	Team	Apps	(Gls)
- Luxembourg

Paul Feierstein (27 January 1903 – 5 May 1963) was a Luxembourgish footballer. He competed at the 1924 Summer Olympics and the 1928 Summer Olympics.

== Managerial career ==
Feierstein was manager of the Luxembourg national football team, in charge for 18 games between 1933 and 1948.

Team	From	To	Record				
Team	From	To	P	W	D	L	Win %
Luxembourg	4 June 1933	24 May 1948	18	4	0	14	22.2
