= Albert Henderickx =

Belgian footballer

Personal information
- Date of birth: 24 September 1900
- Place of birth: Antwerp, Belgium
- Date of death: 27 June 1965 (aged 64)

Senior career*
Years	Team	Apps	(Gls)
1921–1929	Beerschot		
1929–1933	Oude God Sport		

International career
1924	Belgium	1	(0)
- * Club domestic league appearances and goals

Albert Henderickx (24 September 1900 – 27 June 1965) was a Belgian footballer. He played in one match for the Belgium national football team in 1924.
