= Dymitr =

Dymitr is a given name. Notable people with the name include:

- Dymitr of Goraj (1340–1400), a Grand Crown Marshal from 1390 and Court Treasurer in the years 1364–1370 and 1377–1391
- Michał Dymitr Krajewski (1746–1817), Polish writer and educational activist of the times of the Enlightenment in Poland
- Dymitr of Sienno, 15th century Polish nobleman of the Debno Coat of Arms
- Jan Dymitr Solikowski (1539–1603), Polish writer, diplomat, Archbishop of Lwów
- Dymitr Jerzy Wiśniowiecki (1631–1682), Polish magnate and szlachcic

== See also ==
- Dmytro
- Dmitry
