= Riskalla Henain =

Egyptian footballer (born 1903)

Personal information
- Date of birth: 1903

International career
Years	Team	Apps	(Gls)
- Egypt

Riskalla Henain (born 1903, date of death unknown) was an Egyptian footballer. He competed in the men's tournament at the 1924 Summer Olympics.
