= Nicolas Kirsch =

Luxembourgish footballer

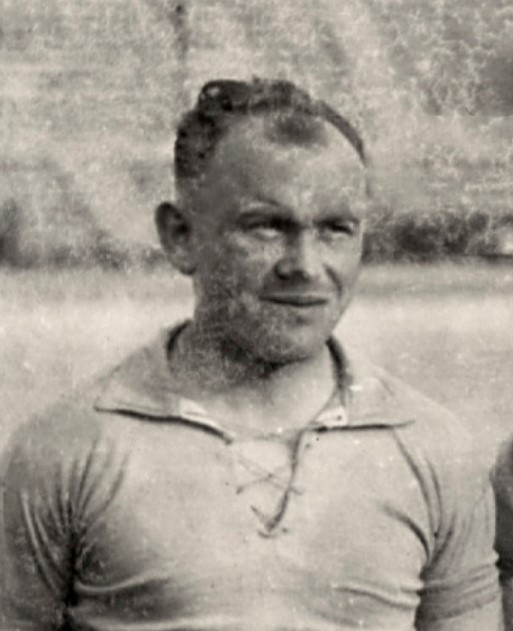
- Nicolas Kirsch in 1928

Personal information
- Date of birth: 28 August 1901
- Place of birth: Luxembourg, Luxembourg
- Date of death: 29 September 1983 (aged 82)
- Place of death: Luxembourg, Luxembourg

International career
Years	Team	Apps	(Gls)
- Luxembourg

Nicolas Kirsch (28 August 1901 – 29 September 1983) was a Luxembourgish footballer. He competed at the 1924 Summer Olympics and the 1928 Summer Olympics.
