= Klaas Breeuwer =

Dutch footballer

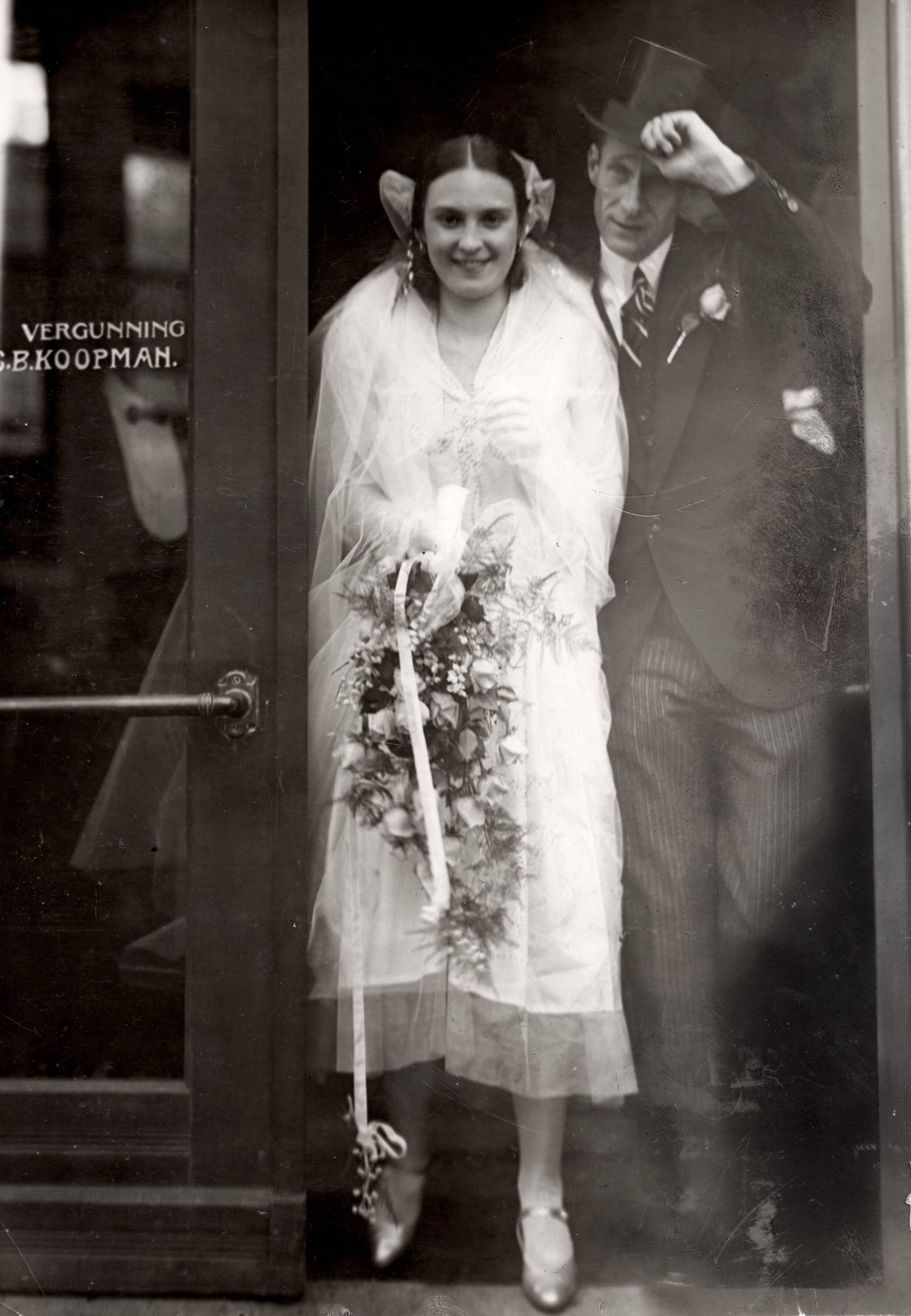
- Breeuwer in 1929

Personal information
- Date of birth: 25 November 1901
- Place of birth: Zaandam, Netherlands
- Date of death: 24 April 1961 (aged 59)
- Place of death: Haarlem, Netherlands

Senior career*
Years	Team	Apps	(Gls)
1921–1923	ZVV Zaandam		
1923–1925	Haarlem		
1925–1926	ZVV Zaandam		
1926–1929	ZFC		

International career
1924	Netherlands	1	(0)
- * Club domestic league appearances and goals

Klaas Breeuwer (25 November 1901 – 24 April 1961) was a Dutch footballer. He competed in the men's tournament at the 1924 Summer Olympics.

== Personal life ==
Breeuwer married Jopie Koopman, the first ever winner of the Miss Holland competition in 1929.
