= Paul Rouster =

Luxembourgish footballer

Personal information
- Date of birth: 19 May 1900
- Date of death: 20 July 1982 (aged 82)

International career
Years	Team	Apps	(Gls)
1923-1937	Luxembourg	13	(0)

Paul Rouster (19 May 1900 – 20 July 1982) was a Luxembourgish footballer. He played in thirteen matches for the Luxembourg national football team between 1923 and 1937.
