= Gyula Tóth (footballer, born 1901) =

Hungarian footballer

Personal information
- Date of birth: 10 June 1901
- Place of birth: Székesfehérvár, Austria-Hungary
- Date of death: 22 April 1936 (aged 34)
- Place of death: Budapest, Hungary
- Position: Midfielder

International career
Years	Team	Apps	(Gls)
1922-1924	Hungary	5	(0)

Gyula Tóth (10 June 1901 – 22 April 1936) was a Hungarian footballer. He played in five matches for the Hungary national football team between 1922 and 1924.
