= Artūrs Timpers =

Latvian footballer

Personal information
- Date of birth: 4 May 1906
- Date of death: 1960 (aged 53–54)
- Position: Forward

International career
Years	Team	Apps	(Gls)
1925–1926	Latvia	4	(0)

Artūrs Timpers (4 May 1906 – 1960) was a Latvian footballer. He played in four matches for the Latvia national football team from 1925 to 1926. He was also part of Latvia's squad for the football tournament at the 1924 Summer Olympics, but he did not play in any matches.
