= Carl Johnson (soccer) =

American soccer player

Personal information
- Full name: Carl W. F. Johnson
- Date of birth: September 18, 1892
- Place of birth: Gavleborg, Sweden
- Date of death: February 15, 1970 (aged 77)
- Place of death: Tampa, Florida, United States

Senior career*
Years	Team	Apps	(Gls)
- Chicago Swedish-Americans

International career
1924	United States	2	(0)
- * Club domestic league appearances and goals

Carl Johnson (September 18, 1892 – February 15, 1970) was a U.S. soccer midfielder. He was the first U.S. player from Chicago to play for the national team. Johnson earned two caps with the U.S. national team. His first came at the 1924 Summer Olympics when he played in the U.S. loss to Uruguay in the quarterfinals. Following the tournament, the U.S. had two exhibition games. Johnson played in the first, a 3–2 win over Poland. Johnson played with the Chicago Swedish-Americans.

He died in Tampa, Florida.
