= Hamit Akbay =

Turkish footballer

Personal information
- Date of birth: 1900

International career
Years	Team	Apps	(Gls)
1924-1925	Turkey	6	(0)

Hamit Akbay (born 1900, date of death unknown) was a Turkish footballer. He played in six matches for the Turkey national football team in 1924 and 1925.
