= François Weber =

Luxembourgish footballer

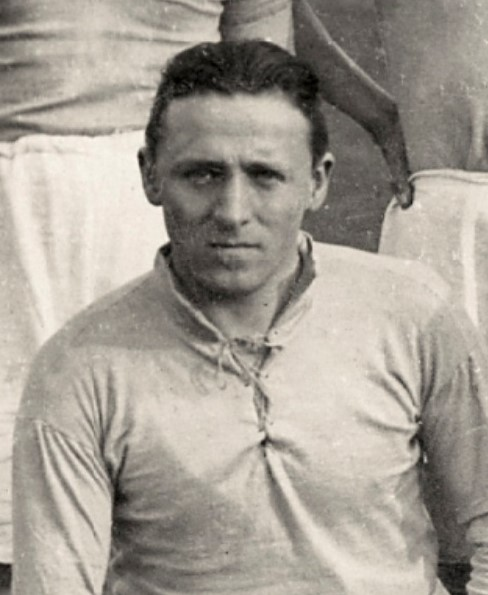
- François Weber in 1928

Personal information
- Date of birth: 21 December 1898
- Place of birth: Luxembourg, Luxembourg
- Date of death: 27 January 1961 (aged 62)
- Place of death: Luxembourg, Luxembourg

International career
Years	Team	Apps	(Gls)
- Luxembourg

François Weber (21 December 1898 – 27 January 1961) was a Luxembourgish footballer. He competed in the men's tournament at the 1928 Summer Olympics.
