= İbrahim Kelle =

Turkish footballer

Personal information
- Date of birth: 1897
- Date of death: 2 February 1965 (aged 67–68)
- Position: Midfielder

International career
Years	Team	Apps	(Gls)
1923	Turkey	1	(0)

İbrahim Kelle (1897 – 2 February 1965) was a Turkish footballer. He played in one match for the Turkey national football team in 1923. He was also part of Turkey's squad for the football tournament at the 1924 Summer Olympics, but he did not play in any matches.
