= Otto Krombholz =

Czechoslovak footballer

Personal information
- Date of birth: 3 February 1899
- Place of birth: Třemošná, Austria-Hungary

Senior career*
Years	Team	Apps	(Gls)
1924–1926	DFC Prag		

International career
1924–1926	Czechoslovakia	2	(0)
- * Club domestic league appearances and goals

Otto Krombholz (also spelled Krompholz) (born 3 February 1899, date of death unknown) was a Czechoslovak footballer. He competed in the men's tournament at the 1924 Summer Olympics. At club level, Krompholz played for ethnic German club DFC Prag. He also won two caps for the Czechoslovakia national team.
