= Voldemārs Viņķis =

Latvian footballer

Personal information
- Date of birth: 14 October 1903
- Place of birth: Tukums, Latvia
- Date of death: 1954 (aged 50–51)

International career
Years	Team	Apps	(Gls)
1924	Latvia	1	(0)

Voldemārs Viņķis (14 October 1903 – 1954) was a Latvian footballer. He played in one match for the Latvia national football team in 1924. He was also part of Latvia's squad for the football tournament at the 1924 Summer Olympics, but he did not play in any matches.
