= Antonín Hojer =

Czechoslovak footballer (1894–1964)

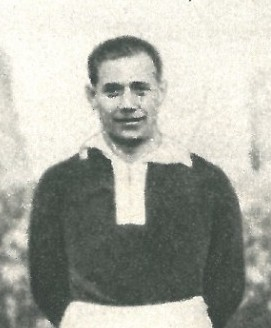

Personal information
- Date of birth: 31 March 1894
- Place of birth: Prague, Austria-Hungary
- Date of death: 20 October 1964
- Place of death: Czechoslovakia
- Position: Defender

Senior career*
Years	Team	Apps	(Gls)
1913–1931	AC Sparta Prague	91	(34)

International career
1920–1930	Czechoslovakia	35	(3)
- * Club domestic league appearances and goals

Antonín Hojer (31 March 1894 – 20 October 1964) was a former Czechoslovak footballer. He played 35 games and scored 3 goals for the Czechoslovakia national football team. Hojer represented Czechoslovakia at the 1920 Olympics and 1924 Olympics. His younger brother František was also a Czechoslovak footballer.

== Career Statistics ==
=== International ===
As of match played 17 July 2026

Appearances and goals by national team and year
National team	Year	Apps	Goals
Czechoslovakia
Czechoslovakia	1920	4	0
Czechoslovakia	1921	1	0
Czechoslovakia	1922	2	0
Czechoslovakia	1923	4	0
Czechoslovakia	1924	3	0
Czechoslovakia	1925	2	0
Czechoslovakia	1926	4	0
Czechoslovakia	1928	4	0
Czechoslovakia	1929	7	1
Czechoslovakia	1930	4	2
Total		35	3
