= Joop ter Beek =

Dutch footballer

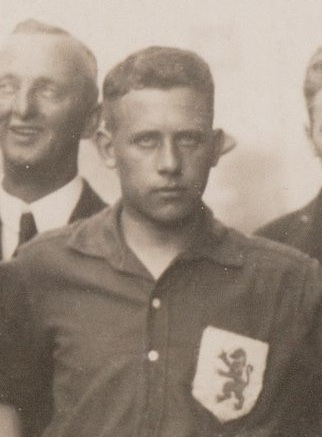
- Joop ter Beek in 1924

Personal information
- Full name: Adrianus Johannes ter Beek
- Date of birth: 1 June 1901
- Place of birth: Breda, Netherlands
- Date of death: 5 September 1934 (aged 33)
- Place of death: Breda, Netherlands

Senior career*
Years	Team	Apps	(Gls)
1923–1924	NAC		

International career
1924	Netherlands	1	(0)
- * Club domestic league appearances and goals

Adrianus Johannes "Joop" ter Beek (1 June 1901 – 5 September 1934) was a Dutch footballer. He competed in the men's tournament at the 1924 Summer Olympics.

A player of NAC, Ter Beek made one appearance for the Netherlands on 2 June 1924 against Ireland. The setting in which he made his international debut was bleak, as game was played on a practice pitch in front of only a few spectators. Journalists wrote about the match: "Rarely has the national team played so lazily, so listlessly". For Ter Beek, it proved to be the end of an international career, as the cap was his only one.

Ter Beek died on 5 September 1934, aged 33.
