= Vincas Bartuška =

Lithuanian footballer

Personal information
- Date of birth: 14 April 1901
- Place of birth: Turlojiškė, Marijampole Municipality, Lithuania
- Date of death: 11 September 1988 (aged 87)
- Place of death: Willoughby Hills, Ohio, United States
- Position: Defender

Senior career*
Years	Team	Apps	(Gls)
19??–19??	LFLS Kaunas		

International career
1923–1926	Lithuania	7	(0)
- * Club domestic league appearances and goals

Vincas Bartuška (14 January 1901 – 11 September 1988) was a Lithuanian footballer who competed in the 1924 Summer Olympics.

Bartuška played in the first ever Lithuanian international football match on 26 June 1923 against Estonia, a year later he was representing his country at the 1924 Summer Olympics held in Paris, France, where they lost 0–9 against Switzerland in the first round. Bartuška in total played seven times for his country and three of them were as captain.
