= Jurgis Hardingsonas =

Lithuanian footballer (1892–1936)

Personal information
- Date of birth: 24 September 1892
- Date of death: Unknown
- Position: Defender

Senior career*
Years	Team	Apps	(Gls)
19??–19??	KSK Kaunas		

International career
1924–1924	Lithuania	2	(0)
- * Club domestic league appearances and goals

Jurgis Hardingsonas (24 September 1892 – 1936, Germany) was a Lithuanian footballer who competed in the 1924 Summer Olympics, they lost that match 0–9 against Switzerland and didn't advance any further in the tournament, two days later they played Egypt in a friendly in Paris and lost 0–10, Hardingsonas didn't play international football again.
