= Josef Sloup-Štaplík =

Czech footballer

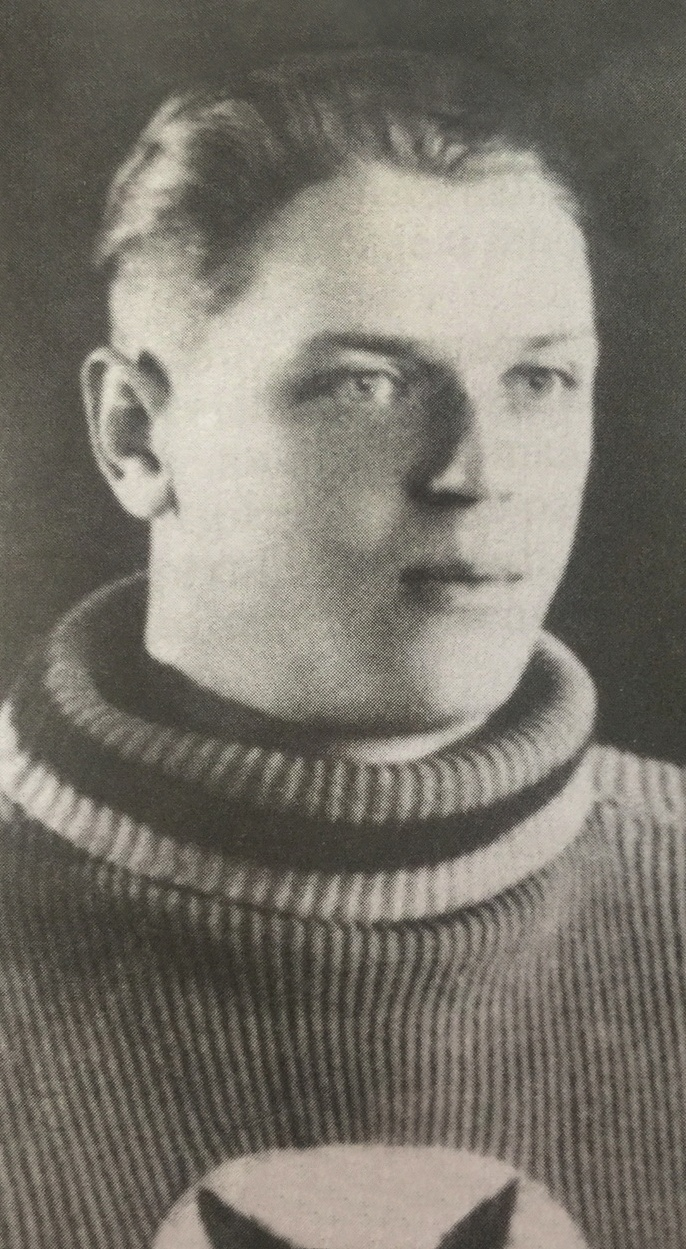

Personal information
- Date of birth: 19 December 1897
- Place of birth: Plzeň, Austria-Hungary
- Date of death: 26 October 1954 (aged 56)
- Place of death: Czechoslovakia
- Position: Goalkeeper

Senior career*
Years	Team	Apps	(Gls)
1925–1930	Slavia Prague	21	(0)

International career
1924–1930	Czechoslovakia	16	(0)

Managerial career
- 1930–1933: Slavia Prague
- * Club domestic league appearances and goals

Josef Sloup known as Štaplík (19 December 1897 – 26 October 1954) was a Czechoslovak football goalkeeper. He played 16 games for the Czechoslovakia national football team. He represented Czechoslovakia at the 1924 Olympics. His older brother Rudolf was also a footballer.
