= William Demko =

American soccer player

Personal information
- Full name: William Jacob Demko
- Date of birth: December 20, 1895
- Place of birth: Philadelphia, Pennsylvania
- Date of death: August 8, 1957 (aged 61)
- Place of death: Philadelphia, Pennsylvania

Senior career*
Years	Team	Apps	(Gls)
1923–1924	Philadelphia Fleischer Yarn		

International career
1924	United States MNT	2	(0)
- * Club domestic league appearances and goals

William Jacob Demko (December 20, 1895 – August 8, 1957) was a U.S. soccer defender who was a member of the U.S. soccer team at the 1924 Summer Olympics. Demko earned two cap with the U.S. national team in 1924. While Demko was a member of the U.S. team at the Olympics, he did not play in the two U.S. games. However, following the tournament, the U.S. had two exhibition games. Demko played in both, a win over Poland and a loss to Ireland.

He was born in Philadelphia, Pennsylvania.
