= Árpád Hajós =

Hungarian footballer (1902–1971)

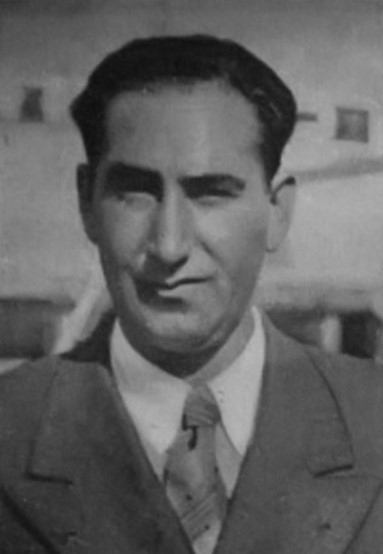

Personal information
- Date of birth: 25 March 1902
- Place of birth: Budapest, Austria-Hungary
- Date of death: 23 January 1971 (aged 68)
- Place of death: Massa, Italy

International career
Years	Team	Apps	(Gls)
1923	Hungary	2	(0)

Árpád Hajós (25 March 1902 – 23 January 1971) was a Hungarian footballer. He played in two matches for the Hungary national football team in 1923.
