= Stasys Janušauskas =

Lithuanian footballer

Personal information
- Date of birth: 13 May 1902
- Place of birth: Liepāja, Russian Empire
- Date of death: 16 February 1996 (aged 93)
- Place of death: Kaunas, Lithuania
- Position: Defender

Senior career*
Years	Team	Apps	(Gls)
19??–19??	ŠŠ Kovas Kaunas		

International career
1924–1926	Lithuania	5	(0)
- * Club domestic league appearances and goals

Stasys Janušauskas (13 May 1902 – 16 February 1996) was a Lithuanian footballer who competed in the 1924 Summer Olympics.

Janušauskas was a defender for ŠŠ Kovas Kaunas when he got called up to represent Lithuania at the 1924 Summer Olympics in Paris, France, where they lost in the first round against Switzerland 0–9. Over the next two years Janušauskas played four more internationals.
