= Étienne Bausch =

Luxembourgish footballer

Personal information
- Date of birth: 17 June 1901
- Place of birth: Differdange, Luxembourg
- Date of death: 25 January 1970 (aged 68)
- Place of death: Luxembourg, Luxembourg

International career
Years	Team	Apps	(Gls)
- Luxembourg

Étienne Bausch (17 June 1901 – 25 January 1970) was a Luxembourgish footballer. He competed in the men's tournament at the 1924 Summer Olympics.
