= Juozas Žebrauskas =

Lithuanian footballer

Personal information
- Date of birth: 31 August 1904
- Date of death: 14 May 1933 (aged 28)
- Position: Forward

Senior career*
Years	Team	Apps	(Gls)
19??–19??	ŠŠ Kovas Kaunas		

International career
1924–1926	Lithuania	5	(0)
- * Club domestic league appearances and goals

Juozas Žebrauskas (31 August 1904 – 14 May 1933) was a Lithuanian footballer who competed in the 1924 Summer Olympics.

Žebrauskas was a forward for ŠŠ Kovas Kaunas when he got called up to represent Lithuania at the 1924 Summer Olympics in Paris, France, they lost in the first round against Switzerland 0–9, afterwards he played four international friendlies and was never on the winning side.
