= Stasys Razma =

Lithuanian footballer

Personal information
- Date of birth: 18 July 1898
- Place of birth: Kaunas, Lithuania
- Date of death: 30 July 1960 (aged 62)
- Position: Defender

Senior career*
Years	Team	Apps	(Gls)
19??–19??	LFLS Kaunas		

International career
1923–1925	Lithuania	5	(0)
- * Club domestic league appearances and goals

Stasys Razma (18 July 1898 – 30 July 1960) was a Lithuanian footballer who competed in the 1924 Summer Olympics.

Razma was in the side that played in Lithuania's first ever international in 1923 against Estonia, which they lost 5–0, the following year he was called to play in his national side's first ever Olympic match which was in Paris, France, but the inexperienced side lost 9–0 to Switzerland so did not advance any further in the competition. Razma went on to play three more international matches including a 2–1 victory against Estonia, the country's first ever international win.
