= Edvardas Mikučiauskas =

Lithuanian footballer

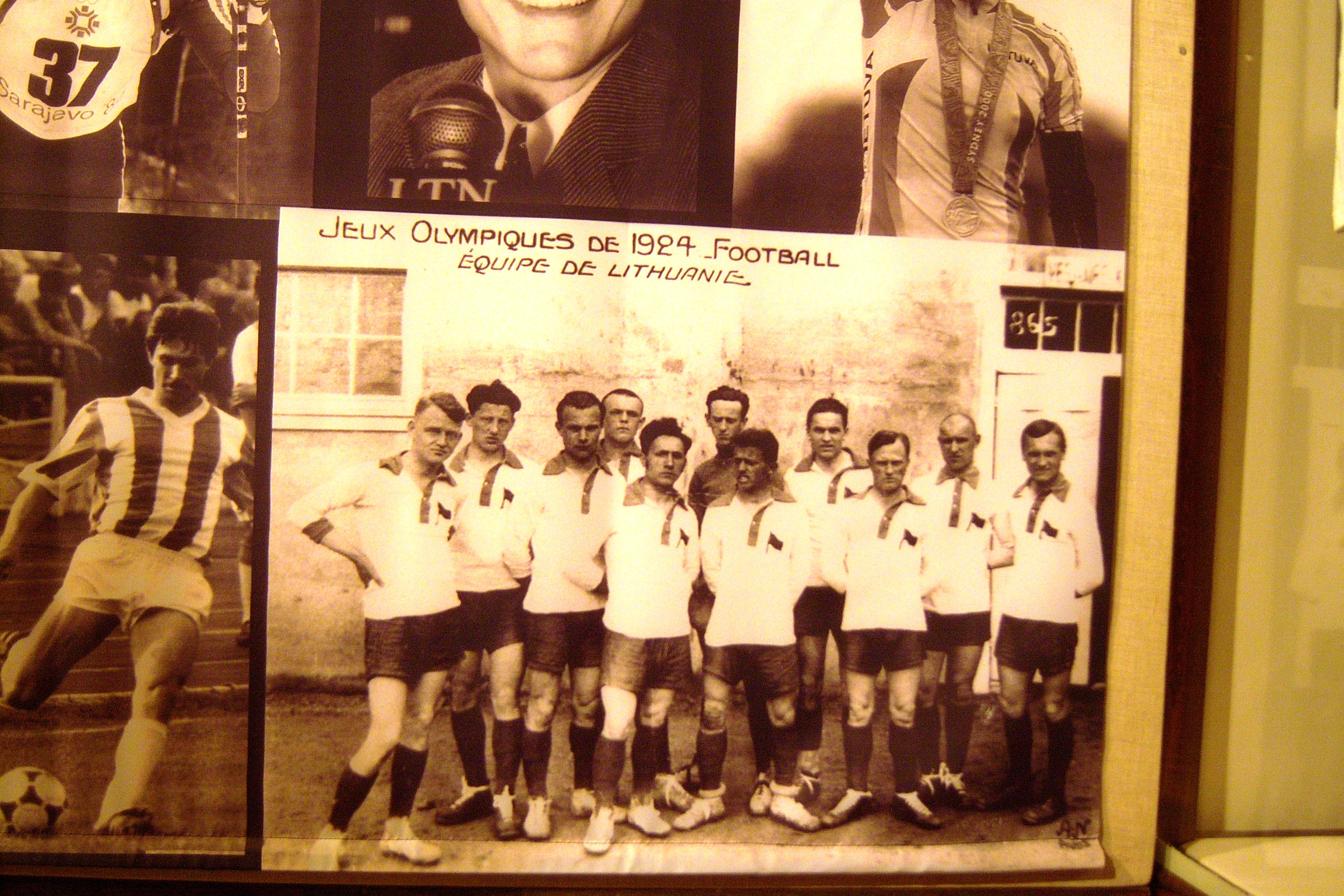

Personal information
- Date of birth: 23 August 1901
- Date of death: 21 February 1986 (aged 84)
- Position: Midfielder

Senior career*
Years	Team	Apps	(Gls)
19??–19??	ŠŠ Kovas Kaunas		

International career
1924–1924	Lithuania	1	(0)
- * Club domestic league appearances and goals

Edvardas Mikučiauskas (23 August 1901 – 21 February 1986) was a Lithuanian footballer who competed in the 1924 Summer Olympics, the 0-9 defeat against Switzerland was his only international match he played.
