= Leonas Juozapaitis =

Lithuanian footballer

- Leonas Juozapaitis, Lithuanian football player at the Olympics (1924)

Personal information
- Date of birth: 18 January 1901
- Place of birth: Vilnius, Russian Empire
- Date of death: 13 August 1980 (aged 79)
- Place of death: Kaunas, Lithuanian SSR
- Position: Midfielder

Senior career*
Years	Team	Apps	(Gls)
19??–19??	LFLS Kaunas		

International career
1924–1926	Lithuania	4	(0)
- * Club domestic league appearances and goals

Leonas Juozapaitis (18 January 1901 – 13 August 1980) was a Lithuanian footballer who competed in the 1924 Summer Olympics.

Juozapaitis was a midfielder for LFLS Kaunas when he got called up to represent Lithuania in their first ever international in 1923 against Estonia, the next year he played at the 1924 Summer Olympics in Paris, France, where they lost in the first round against Switzerland 0–9, his next two international matches also ended in defeat.

He was also a keen athlete and was the Lithuanian 2 km champion in 1922 and in the same year he played in the first Lithuanian basketball match.
