= Rudolf Sloup-Štapl =

Czechoslovak footballer (1895–1936)

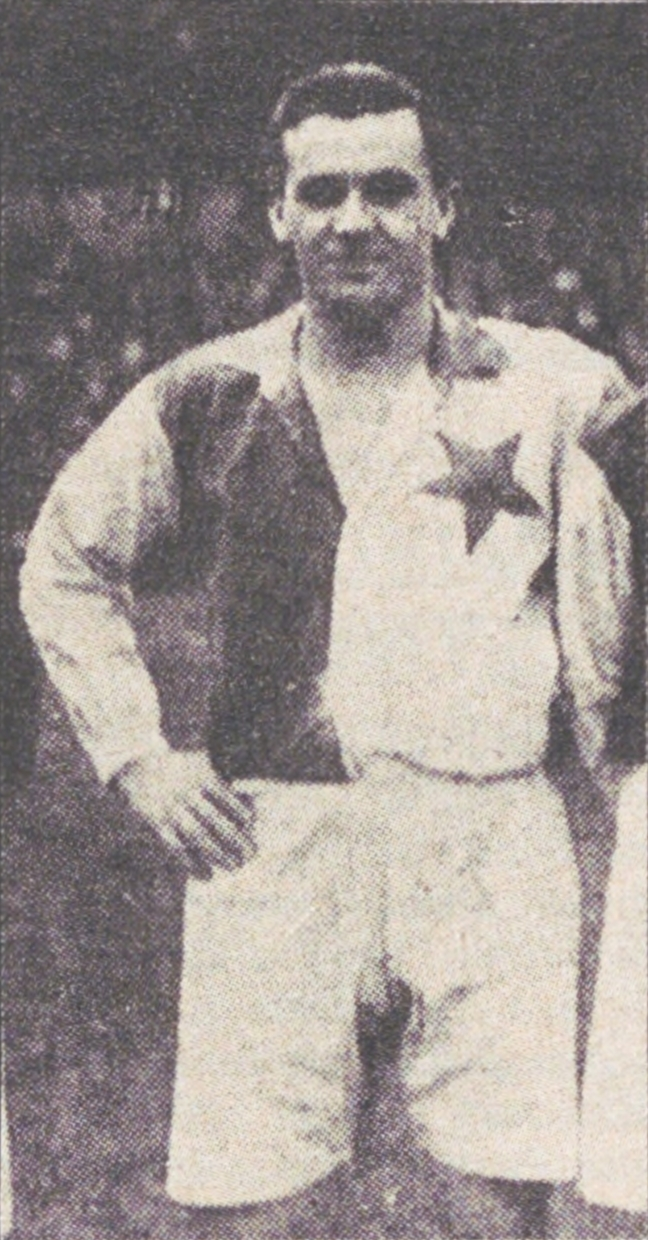

Personal information
- Date of birth: 17 November 1895
- Place of birth: Plzeň, Austria-Hungary
- Date of death: 7 September 1936 (aged 40)
- Place of death: Czechoslovakia
- Position: Striker

Senior career*
Years	Team	Apps	(Gls)
1919–1921	SK Židenice		
1921–1925	SK Slavia Prague		
1926–1928	ČAFC Vinohrady		

International career
1922–1924	Czechoslovakia	8	(8)
- * Club domestic league appearances and goals

Rudolf Sloup known as Štapl (17 November 1895 – 7 September 1936) was a Czechoslovak footballer. He played 8 games and scored 8 goals for the Czechoslovakia national football team. He represented Czechoslovakia at the 1924 Olympics.

He was also a player-coach of the Yugoslav side Hajduk Split in 1920. His younger brother Josef was also a footballer.
