= Hansas Gecas =

Lithuanian footballer

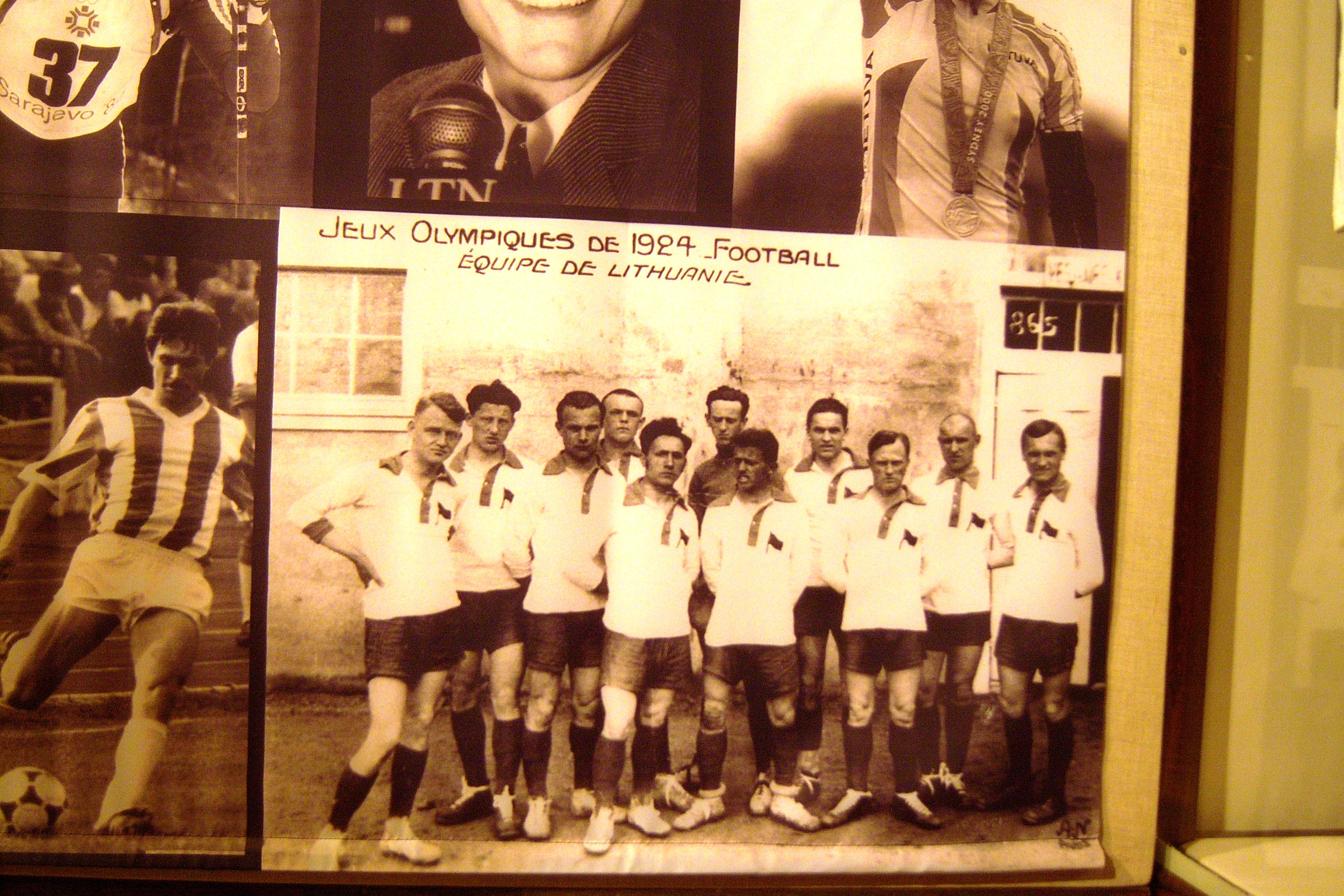

Personal information
- Date of birth: 24 September 1899
- Date of death: Unknown
- Position: Forward

Senior career*
Years	Team	Apps	(Gls)
19??–19??	KSK Kaunas		

International career
1924–1924	Lithuania	2	(0)
- * Club domestic league appearances and goals

Hansas Gecas (24 September 1899 – Unknown) was a Lithuanian footballer who competed in the 1924 Summer Olympics. His team lost their match 0–9 against Switzerland and did not advance any further in the tournament; two days later they played Egypt in a friendly in Paris and lost 0–10. Hansas did not play international football again.
