= Steponas Garbačiauskas =

Lithuanian footballer

- Born: 17 April 1900; Riga, Russian Empire
- Died: 3 August 1983 (aged 83); Zürich, Switzerland
- Resting place: Petrašiūnai Cemetery
- Occupations: Athlete, football player, sports journalist, diplomat
- Spouse: Elena Kubiliūnaitė
- Children: Rita Garbačiauskaitė
Association football career
- Position: Forward
Senior career*
Years	Team	Apps	(Gls)
19??–1923	LFLS Kaunas		
1924–1925	KSK Kaunas		
1926–19??	ŠŠ Kovas Kaunas		
International career
1923–1926	Lithuania	6	(0)
- * Club domestic league appearances and goals

Steponas "Stepas" Garbačiauskas (17 April 1900 – 3 August 1983) was a Lithuanian record-holding athlete, football player, sports journalist, and diplomat. He is regarded as one of the Lithuanian sports pioneers.

Garbačiauskas was a forward and captain of the first Lithuanian footballing international in 1923 against Estonia, the following year he played in the 1924 Summer Olympics, against Switzerland which they lost 0-9 and didn't advance any further, over the next couple of years he played four more ties for his country.

Garbačiauskas was buried at the Petrašiūnai Cemetery.
