= Switzerland national football team results (1920–1939) =

- Win Draw Loss

This is a list of international football matches of the Switzerland national football team from 1920 until 1939.

Between 1920 and 1939, Switzerland played in 9 matches, resulting in 4 victories, 2 draws and 3 defeats. (through 1921)

== Results ==
=== 1920 ===
| Wins | Draws | Losses |
|---|---|---|
| 4 | 0 | 1 |

| 29 February 1920 International Friendly | Switzerland | 0–2 | France | Geneva, Switzerland |
| | | Report | Devaquez 43'; Nicolas 78' | Stadium: Stade des Charmilles; Attendance: 20,000 |

| 28 March 1920 International Friendly | Switzerland | 3–0 | Italy | Bern, Switzerland |
| | Merkt 11', 70'; Kramer 59' | Report | | Stadium: Neufeld Stadion |

| 16 May 1920 International Friendly | Switzerland | 2–1 | Netherlands | Basel, Switzerland |
| | Friedrich 74'; Merkt 75' | Report | de Natris 40' | Stadium: Landhof; Attendance: 5,000; Referee: Giovanni Mauro |

| 6 June 1920 International Friendly | Sweden | 0–1 | Switzerland | Stockholm, Sweden |
| | | Report | Martenet 82' | Stadium: Olympic Stadium; Attendance: 12,000; Referee: Wim Eymers |

| 27 June 1920 International Friendly | Switzerland | 4–1 | Germany | Zurich, Switzerland |
| | Meyer, Merkt; Afflerbach | Report | Jager | Stadium: Letzigrund; Referee: L Ballint |

=== 1921 ===
| Wins | Draws | Losses |
|---|---|---|
| 0 | 2 | 2 |

| 6 March 1921 International Friendly | Italy | 2–1 | Switzerland | Milan, Italy |
| | Migliavacca 5'; Cevenini 58' | Report | Fontana 14' | Stadium: Campo di Viale Lombardia; Referee: Marcel Slawik |

| 28 March 1921 International Friendly | Netherlands | 2–0 | Switzerland | Amsterdam, Netherlands |
| | Kessler 2'; Gupffert 15' | Report | | Stadium: Oude Stadion; Attendance: 28,000; Referee: Hagbard Vestergaard |

| 1 May 1921 International Friendly | Switzerland | 2–2 | Austria | St Gallen, Switzerland |
| | Brand; Friedrich | Report | Kuthan; Neubauer | Stadium: Paul-Gruninger Stadion; Referee: Karl Koppelhel |

| 6 November 1921 International Friendly | Switzerland | 1–1 | Italy | Geneva, Switzerland |
| | Pache 56' | Report | Moscardini 10' | Stadium: Stade de Genève; Referee: Hugo Meisl |

=== 1922 ===
| Wins | Draws | Losses |
|---|---|---|
| 0 | 2 | 0 |

| 15 June 1922 International friendly | Hungary | 1–1 | Switzerland | Budapest, Hungary |
| | Blum | Report | Merkt | Stadium: Nepstadion; Attendance: 15,000; Referee: Heinrich Retschury (Austria) |

| 3 December 1922 International friendly | Italy | 2–2 | Switzerland | Bologna, Italy |
| 14:30 CET (UTC+01:00) | L. Cevenini 10', 30' | Report | Pache 58'; Ramseyer 85' | Stadium: Motovelodromo; Attendance: 25,000; Referee: Heinrich Retschury (Austria) |

=== 1924 ===
| Wins | Draws | Losses |
|---|---|---|
| 4 | 1 | 1 |

| 25 May 1924 1924 Summer Olympics; First Round | Switzerland | 9–0 | Lithuania | Vincennes, France |
| 15:30 | Sturzenegger 2', 43', 68', 85'; Dietrich 14'; Abegglen 41', 50', 58'; Ramseyer 63' (pen.) | Report | | Stadium: Stade Pershing, Attendance: 8,110; Referee: Antonio Scamoni (ITA) |

| 28 May 1924 1924 Summer Olympics Second Round | Switzerland | 1–1 (a.e.t.) | Czechoslovakia | Paris, France |
| 17:00 | Dietrich 79' | Report | Sloup 21' (pen.) | Stadium: Stade Bergeyre; Attendance: 9,153; Referee: Peder Christian Andersen (Norway) |

| 30 May 1924 1924 Summer Olympics Second Round Replay | Switzerland | 1–0 | Czechoslovakia | Paris, France |
| 17:00 | Pache 87' | Report | | Stadium: Stade Bergeyre; Attendance: 5,673; Referee: Marcel Slawik (France) |

| 2 June 1924 1924 Summer Olympics; Quarter-final | Switzerland | 2–1 | Italy | Paris, France |
| 17:00 WEST (UTC+01:00) | Sturzenegger 47'; Abegglen 60' | Report | Della Valle 52' | Stadium: Stade Bergeyre; Attendance: 8,359; Referee: Johannes Mutters (Netherlands) |

| 5 June 1924 1924 Summer Olympics Semi-finals | Switzerland | 2–1 | Sweden | Colombes, France |
| 17:00 | Abegglen 15', 77' | Report | Kock 41' | Stadium: Stade Olympique; Attendance: 7,448; Referee: Mihaly Ivancsics (Hungary) |

| 9 June 1924 1924 Summer Olympics Final | Uruguay | 3–0 | Switzerland | Colombes, France |
| | Petrone 9'; Cea 65'; Romano 82' | Report | | Stadium: Stade Olympique; Attendance: 40,522; Referee: Marcel Slawik (France) |

=== 1925 ===
| Wins | Draws | Losses |
|---|---|---|
| 0 | 1 | 0 |

| 24 May 1925 International Friendly | Switzerland | 0–0 | Belgium | Lausanne, Switzerland |
| | | Report | | Stadium: Stade Olympique de la Pontaise; Attendance: 16,000; Referee: Heinrich Retschury |

=== 1926 ===
| Wins | Draws | Losses |
|---|---|---|
| 0 | 1 | 1 |

| 18 April 1926 International friendly | Switzerland | 1–1 | Italy | Zürich, Switzerland |
| 15:00 CET (UTC+01:00) | Ehrenbolger 19' | Report | Magnozzi 8' | Stadium: Letzigrund; Attendance: 20,000; Referee: Mihály Ivanicsics (Hungary) |

| 9 May 1926 International friendly | Italy | 3–2 | Switzerland | Milan, Italy |
| 15:30 CET (UTC+01:00) | Della Valle 11', 38'; Schiavio 17' | Report | Sturzenegger 49'; Brand 57' | Stadium: Arena Civica; Attendance: 25,000; Referee: Albert Prince-Cox (England) |

=== 1927 ===
| Wins | Draws | Losses |
|---|---|---|
| 0 | 1 | 1 |

| 30 January 1927 International friendly | Switzerland | 1–5 | Italy | Geneva, Switzerland |
| 15:00 CET (UTC+01:00) | Weiler 37' | Report | Baloncieri 13', 34', 65'; Libonatti 18'; Rossetti 40' | Stadium: Parc des Sports; Attendance: 15,000; Referee: Albert Prince-Cox (England) |

| 6 November 1927 Friendly | Switzerland | 2–2 | Sweden | Zürich, Switzerland |
| 14:30 (UTC+1:00) | Ramseyer 20' (pen.); Abegglen 26' | Report | Rydell 21'; Kroon 33' | Stadium: Letzigrund; Attendance: 17,840; Referee: Eugen Braun (Austria) |

=== 1928 ===
| Wins | Draws | Losses |
|---|---|---|
| 0 | 0 | 2 |

| 1 January 1928 1927–30 Central European Cup | Italy | 3–2 | Switzerland | Genoa, Italy |
| 14:40 CET (UTC+01:00) | Libonatti 10', 58'; Magnozzi 68' | Report | Abegglen 38', 60' | Stadium: Stadio Marassi; Attendance: 28,000; Referee: Stanley Rous (England) |

| 14 October 1928 1927–30 Central European Cup | Switzerland | 2–3 | Italy | Zürich, Switzerland |
| 15:00 CET (UTC+01:00) | Abegglen 2'; Grimm 85' | Report | Rossetti 17', 30'; Baloncieri 80' | Stadium: Sportplatz Förrlibuck; Attendance: 20,000; Referee: Eugen Braun (Austria) |

=== 1929 ===
| Wins | Draws | Losses |
|---|---|---|
| 0 | 0 | 2 |

| 5 May 1929 1927–30 Central European Cup | Switzerland | 1-4 | Czechoslovakia | Lausanne, Switzerland |
| 15:00 (UTC+1:00) | M. Abegglen 74' | Report | Podrazil 22'; Silný 23', 85'; Puč 80' | Stadium: Stade Olympique de la Pontaise; Attendance: 20,000; Referee: Eugen Braun (Austria) |

| 6 October 1929 1927–30 Central European Cup | Czechoslovakia | 5-0 | Switzerland | Prague, Czechoslovakia |
| 15:00 (UTC+1:00) | Puč 17', 81'; Kratochvíl 18'; Svoboda 36'; Junek 64' | Report | | Stadium: Stadion Letná; Attendance: 17,000; Referee: John Langenus (Belgium) |

=== table ===
| Match | Date | Venue | Opponent | Result | Competition | Switzerland scorers | Attendance | Ref. |
|---|---|---|---|---|---|---|---|---|
| 39 | 26 March 1922 | Frankfurt | Germany | 2-2 | International Friendly | Oskar Merkt, Paolo Sturzenegger | 40,000 | |
| 40 | 11 June 1922 | Hohe Warte, Wien | Austria | 1-7 | International Friendly | Albert Leiber | | |
| 42 | 19 November 1922 | Neufeld Stadion, Bern | Netherlands | 5-0 | International Friendly | Max Abegglen (3), Robert Pache, Albert Leiber | 12,000 | |
| 44 | 21 January 1923 | Stade des Charmilles, Geneva | Austria | 2-0 | International Friendly | Albert Leiber, Robert Pache | | |
| 45 | 11 March 1923 | Stade Olympique de la Pontaise, Lausanne | Hungary | 1-6 | International Friendly | Max Abegglen | 10,000 | |
| 46 | 22 April 1923 | Stade Général John Joseph Pershing, Vincennes | France | 2-2 | International Friendly | Robert Afflerbach (2) | 20,000 | |
| 47 | 3 June 1923 | Stadion Rankhof, Basel | Germany | 1-2 | International Friendly | Robert Pache | 25,000 | |
| 48 | 17 June 1923 | Idraetsparken, Copenhagen | Denmark | 2-3 | International Friendly | Robert Pache, Max Abegglen | 25,000 | |
| 49 | 21 June 1923 | Oslo | Norway | 2-2 | International Friendly | Robert Afflerbach, Arnold Charpillod | | |
| 50 | 25 November 1923 | Oude Stadion, Amsterdam | Netherlands | 1-4 | International Friendly | Paul de Lavallaz | 25,000 | |
| 51 | 23 March 1924 | Stade des Charmilles, Geneva | France | 3-0 | International Friendly | Edmond Kramer, Walter Dietrich, Robert Pache | 15,000 | |
| 52 | 21 April 1924 | Stadion Rankhof, Basel | Denmark | 2-0 | International Friendly | Walter Dietrich, Max Abegglen | 15,000 | |
| 53 | 18 May 1924 | Letzigrund, Zurich | Hungary | 4-2 | International Friendly | Walter Dietrich, Paolo Sturzenegger (2), Max Abegglen | 18,000 | |
| 54 | 14 December 1924 | Stuttgart | Germany | 1-1 | International Friendly | Walter Dietrich | 20,000 | |
| 55 | 22 March 1925 | Vienna | Austria | 0-2 | International Friendly | | | |
| 56 | 25 March 1925 | Nepstadion, Budapest | Hungary | 0-5 | International Friendly | | 40,000 | |
| 57 | 19 April 1925 | Letzigrund, Zurich | Netherlands | 4-1 | International Friendly | Paolo Sturzenegger, Oskar Hurzeler (2), Jean Abegglen | 20,000 | |
| 59 | 1 June 1925 | Neufeld Stadion, Bern | Spain | 0-3 | International Friendly | | | |
| 60 | 25 October 1925 | Stadion Rankhof, Basel | Germany | 0-4 | International Friendly | | 15,000 | |
| 61 | 8 November 1925 | Neufeld Stadion, Bern | Austria | 2-0 | International Friendly | Max Abegglen (2) | 12,000 | |
| 62 | 28 March 1926 | Oude Stadion, Amsterdam | Netherlands | 0-5 | International Friendly | | 30,000 | |
| 64 | 25 April 1926 | Stade De Colombes, Paris | France | 0-1 | International Friendly | | 15,000 | |
| 66 | 10 October 1926 | Hohe Warte, Wien | Austria | 1-7 | International Friendly | Aldo Poretti | 19,000 | |
| 67 | 12 Dec 1926 | Munich | Germany | 3-2 | International Friendly | Max Weiler, Ernesto Fink, Max Brand | 40,000 | |
| 68 | 30 Jan 1927 | Stade de Genève, Geneva | Italy | 1-5 | International Friendly | Walter Weiler | | |
| 69 | 17 Apr 1927 | El Sardinero, Santander | Spain | 0-1 | International Friendly | | | |
| 70 | 29 May 1927 | Letzigrund, Zurich | Austria | 1-4 | International Friendly | Willy Jäggi | 28,000 | |
| 73 | 11 March 1928 | Stade Olympique de la Pontaise, Lausanne | France | 3-2 | International Friendly | Willy Jäggi (3), Jacques Romberg | | |
| 74 | 15 April 1928 | Stade de Suisse, Berne | Germany | 2-3 | International Friendly | Willy Jäggi (2) | 20,000 | |
| 75 | 6 May 1928 | Stadion Rankhof, Basel | Netherlands | 2-1 | International Friendly | Gaston Tschirren, Max Abegglen | 20,000 | |
| 77 | 28 October 1928 | Hohe Warte, Wien | Austria | 0-2 | Dr Gero Cup | | 38,000 | |
| 78 | 1 November 1928 | Nepstadion, Budapest | Hungary | 1-3 | Dr Gero Cup | Walter Weiler | 20,000 | |
| 79 | 10 February 1929 | Mannheim | Germany | 1-7 | International Friendly | Max Abegglen | 35,000 | |
| 80 | 17 March 1929 | Olympic Stadium, Amsterdam | Netherlands | 2-3 | International Friendly | Andre Abegglen, Rene Grimm | 25,000 | |
| 81 | 14 April 1929 | Stade de Suisse, Berne | Hungary | 4-5 | Dr Gero Cup | Max Weiler, Andre Abegglen (2), Max Abegglen | 19,000 | |
| 84 | 27 October 1929 | Stade de Suisse, Berne | Austria | 1-3 | Dr Gero Cup | Raymond Passello | | |
| 85 | 9 February 1930 | Nazionale, Rome | Italy | 2-4 | International Friendly | Aldo Poretti (2) | 50,000 | |
| 86 | 23 March 1930 | Stade De Colombes, Paris | France | 3-3 | International Friendly | August Lehmann (2), Jacques Romberg | 20,000 | |
| 87 | 13 April 1930 | Stadion Rankhof, Basel | Hungary | 2-2 | International Friendly | Willy Baumeister, Rudolf Ramseyer | 20,000 | |
| 88 | 4 May 1930 | Letzigrund, Zurich | Germany | 0-5 | International Friendly | | 25,000 | |
| 89 | 15 June 1930 | Olympic Stadium, Stockholm | Sweden | 0-1 | International Friendly | | 17,500 | |
| 90 | 19 June 1930 | Ullevaal Stadion, Oslo | Norway | 0-3 | International Friendly | | 17,000 | |
| 91 | 2 November 1930 | Letzigrund, Zurich | Netherlands | 6-3 | International Friendly | Andre Abegglen (3), Willy Jäggi, Aldo Poretti, Tullio Grassi | 18,000 | |
| 92 | 29 March 1931 | Stade de Suisse, Berne | Italy | 1-1 | Dr Gero Cup | Andre Abegglen | 22,000 | |
| 93 | 12 April 1931 | Nepstadion, Budapest | Hungary | 2-6 | Dr Gero Cup | Andre Abegglen (2) | 25,000 | |
| 94 | 24 May 1931 | Stade des Charmilles, Geneva | Scotland | 2-3 | International Friendly | Albert Buche, Max Fauguel | 10,000 | |
| 95 | 13 June 1931 | Sparta, Prague | Czechoslovakia | 3-7 | Dr Gero Cup | Mario Fasson, Albert Buche, Hermann Springer | 15,000 | |
| 96 | 16 June 1931 | Vienna | Austria | 0-2 | International Friendly | | | |
| 97 | 29 November 1931 | Stadion Rankhof, Basel | Austria | 1-8 | Dr Gero Cup | Andre Abegglen | 25,000 | |
| 98 | 6 December 1931 | King Baudouin Stadium, Brussels | Belgium | 1-2 | International Friendly | Hermann Ehrismann | 15,000 | |
| 99 | 14 February 1932 | Giorgio Ascarelli, Naples | Italy | 0-3 | Dr Gero Cup | | | |
| 100 | 6 March 1932 | Leipzig | Germany | 0-2 | International Friendly | | 50,000 | |
| 101 | 20 March 1932 | Neufeld Stadion, Bern | France | 3-3 | International Friendly | Max Abegglen, Andre Abegglen (2) | 20,000 | |
| 102 | 17 April 1932 | Letzigrund, Zurich | Czechoslovakia | 5-1 | Dr Gero Cup | Andre Abegglen (2), Max Abegglen (2), Leo Billeter | 25.000 | |
| 103 | 19 June 1932 | Stade de Suisse, Berne | Hungary | 3-1 | Dr Gero Cup | Raymond Passello, Willy von Kanel, Max Abegglen | 20,000 | |
| 104 | 23 October 1932 | Praterstadion, Vienna | Austria | 1-3 | Dr Gero Cup | Max Abegglen | 55,000 | |
| 105 | 6 November 1932 | Stadion Rankhof, Basel | Sweden | 2-1 | International Friendly | Andre Abegglen (2) | 22,000 | |
| 106 | 22 January 1933 | Olympic Stadium, Amsterdam | Netherlands | 2-0 | International Friendly | Willy von Kanel, Willy Jäggi | 28,000 | |
| 107 | 12 March 1933 | Letzigrund, Zurich | Belgium | 3-3 | International Friendly | Andre Abegglen, Max Abegglen (2) | 25.000 | |
| 108 | 2 April 1933 | Stade de Genève, Geneva | Italy | 3-0 | Dr Gero Cup | | | |
| 109 | 7 May 1933 | Letzigrund, Zurich | Yugoslavia | 4-1 | International Friendly | Willy von Kanel, Andre Abegglen (2), Alfred Jäck | 20,000 | |
| 110 | 20 May 1933 | Neufeld Stadion, Bern | England | 0-4 | International Friendly | | 26,000 | |
| 111 | 17 September 1933 | Nepstadion, Budapest | Hungary | 0-3 | Dr Gero Cup | | 17,000 | |
| 112 | 24 September 1933 | BSK Beograd, Belgrade | Yugoslavia | 2-2 | 1934 World Cup Qualifying | Alessandro Frigerio, Willy Jaggi | 17,000 | |
| 113 | 29 October 1933 | Stade de Suisse, Berne | Romania | 2-2 | 1934 World Cup Qualifying | Erwin Hochstrasser, Ernst Hufschmid | 15,000 | |
| | 12 November 1939 | Letzigrund, Zurich | Italy | 3-1 | International Friendly | Numa Monnard, Georges Aeby (2) | 10,000 | |

== See also ==
- Switzerland national football team
- Switzerland national football team results (1905–1918)
- Switzerland national football team results (2000–2019)
- Switzerland national football team results (2020–present)
