= 1926–27 Swiss Cup =

Tournament details
- Country: Switzerland
- Teams: 88

Final positions
- Champions: Grasshopper Club
- Runners-up: Young Fellows

The 1926–27 Swiss Cup was the second edition of Switzerland's football cup competition, organised by the Swiss Football Association since the last season 1925–26. This competition was to be continued annually.

== Overview ==
=== Preamble ===
The 1920s not only saw a rapid rise in the popularity of top-level football, but also a decade of rapid growth in grassroots football. In the interwar period, young men were gripped by a "football fever" that was repeatedly lamented in educational circles. In the first post-war season, the football section of the Swiss Football and Athletics Federation (SFAV) had 126 clubs with 20,696 members. By the 1930/31 season, this number had risen to 328 clubs with 66,966 members. After the end of the first world war, especially during the early 1920s, many new football clubs were formed. By around 1925 at the latest, every larger Swiss town seems to have had a football pitch and its own club. Top level organised football also experienced a boom. Not only were small clubs being formed, the larger already existing clubs were expanding and growing too. Between 1922 and 1930, twelve new football stadiums were built, each with a capacity of over 10,000 spectators. However, the hoped-for spectator increases failed to materialise. Furthermore, semi- and fully professional football players began to emerge and transfer fees started to become a reality. Roughly speaking, the Swiss football movement had tripled in size in about a decade.

Switzerland also developed one of the first professional leagues in Europe, which contributed to the professionalisation of the sport. The clubs were modern and innovative, this put Swiss football on the European stage and during this period, many talented players ashined. The golden age of Swiss football was an era of growth, success, and innovation. The combination of sporting success and the development of professional structures laid the foundation for the future development of football in Switzerland and made the country one of the most innovative in European football at that time.

However, at this time, the Swiss league system was beginning to suffer a crisis and this would expand further during the following years. The structure of the Swiss championships provided for a Serie A with 27 teams (3 groups of 9 clubs), a Promotion Series of 54 teams (4 groups of 8 teams, 1 group with 7 and 1 group with nine teams) and, subsequently, the regional Serie B, C and D. There were continuous disagreements between smaller and larger clubs. For example, the smaller clubs wanted direct promotion without going through play-offs, while the larger clubs, with some professional and semi-professional players, were insisting on separating the championship from the lower leagues, in a system similar to that which had already been implemented in Italy in 1922. However, this wish was not adhered to.

In the meantime, to try and relieve these uprising confrontations and the resulting awkward situation, the competition called Swiss Cup was organized for the season 1925–26 by the SFAV. The first edition was a success and this season 88 clubs applied to participate for the "Sandoz Trophy," which is still in use today. Therefore, the preliminary round was expanded, 48 teams played a knock out round, to qualify for the 24 slots in the first round.

=== Format ===
This season's cup competition began with the afore mentioned preliminary round, which was held in advance of the main competition. This qualifying round was played on the first Sunday in September 1926, thus also in advance of the domestic league season. The first principal round was played on the first Sunday in October. The competition was to be completed on Sunday 3 April 1927 with the final, which this year took place at the Förrlibuck in Zürich.

The preliminary round was held for the lower league teams that were not qualified for the main competition. Reserve teams were not admitted to the competition. The 27 clubs from this season's top-tier, the 1926–27 Serie A, joined the cup competition in the first principal round, which was played on Sunday 3 October 1926.

The matches were played in a knockout format. In the event of a draw after 90 minutes, the match went into extra time. In the event of a draw at the end of extra time, if agreed between the clubs, a second extra time was played. If the score was still level at the final whistle, a replay was foreseen and this was played on the visiting team's pitch. If no replay was agreed or if the replay ended in a draw after extra time, a toss of a coin would establish which team was qualified for the next round.

== Preliminary round ==
The lower league teams that had not qualified for the main competition competed here in a knockout qualification round. Reserve teams were not admitted to the competition. The aim of this preliminary stage was to reduce the number of lower league teams before the first round was played. The winners of the qualification were to join the clubs from the top-tier that were automatically qualified. The draw in the qualifying stage, and also in the early rounds of the main competition, respected local regionalities. The qualification round was played in advance of the lower leagues regional season, early in September.

Team 1	Score	Team 2
5 September 1926
SV Seebach (Zürich)	5–4	FC Horgen
Ballspielclub Zürich	6–2	FC Diana Zürich
Luzern	4–2	FC Romanshorn
FC Töss (Winterthur)	3–0	Locarno
FC Liestal	1–3	Frauenfeld
Chiasso	5–1	Wohlen
Baden	1–3	Sparta Schaffhausen
FC Oerlikon (ZH)	1–4	FC Birsfelden
Bellinzona	3–2	FC Neumünster (ZH)
FC Flawil	3–9	Arbon
FC Neuhausen	2–6	Kickers Luzern
FC Wädenswil	2–9	SC Sankt Johann Basel
FC Renens	8–2	Thun
FC Breite (Basel)	1–3	Racing-Club Lausanne
FC Olten	3–0	Concordia Yverdon
FC Madretsch (Biel)	1–6	Black Stars
Montreux-Sports	7–4	FC Langenthal
FC Bözingen	1–3	Vevey Sports
Zähringia Bern	1–2	Villeneuve-Sports
FC Bex	5–2	Delémont
Central Fribourg	0–6	Monthey
FC Viktoria Bern	3–1	Cercle des Sports Bienne
Burgdorf	3–2	Helvetik Basel
FC Allschwil	2–1	Stade Lausanne

== First principal round ==
The winners of the qualification round were to join the clubs from the lower leagues that had already qualified and the teams from the top-tier that were automatically qualified. The draw in the early rounds of the main competition respected local regionalities, whenever possible.

=== Summary ===
Team 1	Score	Team 2
3 October 1926
Frauenfeld	5–3	St. Gallen
Concordia Basel	1–2	Grasshopper Club
Young Boys	4–0	FC Olten
Minerva Bern	1–2	Vevey Sports
CS La Tour-de-Peilz	2–1	FC Bex
Burgdorf	0–4	Racing-Club Lausanne
Biel-Bienne	4–0 FF; Awd 0–3 *	Cantonal Neuchâtel
FC Renens	3–4	Étoile-Sporting
FC Forward Morges	4–2	Stade Nyonnais
Etoile Carouge	4–1	CAA Genève
Montreux-Sports	1–3	Bern
Urania Genève Sport	2–0	FC Viktoria Bern
Monthey	1–3	Black Stars
FC Orbe	0–4	Solothurn
Aarau	0–3	La Chaux-de-Fonds
Fribourg	2–0	FC Allschwil
Grenchen	8–1	Villeneuve-Sports
Lausanne-Sport	1–4	Servette
Basel	0–2	Old Boys
Lugano	11–4	SC Sankt Johann Basel
SV Seebach (Zürich)	0–5	FC Töss (Winterthur)
FC Birsfelden	0–4	Vereinigten FC Winterthur-Veltheim
Zürich	4–1	Red Star
Bellinzona	9–2	Sportverein Winterthur
Brühl	4–1	Sirius Zürich
SC Kleinhüningen	2–0	Ballspielclub Zürich
Kickers Luzern	1–0	Sparta Schaffhausen
Luzern	0–4	Young Fellows
Nordstern	3–0	Hakoah Zürich
Blue Stars	3–0	FC Kreuzlingen-Emmishofen
Chiasso	6–0	FC Höngg
Arbon	1–2	SC Veltheim (Winterthur)

- Note to match Biel-Bienne–Cantonal: The player Würthrich of Biel-Bienne was not qualified. The result was annulled and awarded as 3–0 victory for Cantonal Neuchâtel.

=== Matches ===
3 October 1926

Aarau	0–3	La Chaux-de-Fonds
	FCA summary	Goal

Stadion Brügglifeld, Aarau
- Both teams played the 1926/27 season in the Serie A (top-tier).

3 October 1926

Lausanne-Sport	1–4	Servette
Goal	Servette summary	Passello; Zila; Bailly; Lüthy

Pontaise, Lausanne
- Both teams played the 1926/27 season in the Serie A (top-tier).

3 October 1926
14:00

Basel	0–2 (a.e.t.)	Old Boys
	FCB summary	94' (0:1) Müller; 99' (0:2)

Landhof, Basel
Attendance: 2,000
Referee: (Switzerland) Blum Zürich
- Both teams played the 1926/27 season in the Serie A (top-tier).

3 October 1926

Zürich	4–1	Red Star
Baumeister 18' (1:0); Baumeister (2:0); Pfändler 48' (3:0); Baumeister 75' (4:0)	FCZ summary	88' (4:1) Meier

Letzigrund, Zürich
Attendance: 250
Referee: (Switzerland) Krämer (Basel)
- Zürich played the 1926/27 season in the Serie A (top-tier), Red Star in the Serie Promotion (second-tier).

== Round 2 ==
=== Summary ===
Team 1	Score	Team 2
7 November 1926
Frauenfeld	4–11	Grasshopper Club
Young Boys	7–0	Vevey Sports
CS La Tour-de-Peilz	4–3	Racing-Club Lausanne
Cantonal Neuchâtel	1–3	Étoile-Sporting
FC Forward Morges	1–2	Etoile Carouge
Bern	3–0	Urania Genève Sport
Black Stars	1–7	Solothurn
La Chaux-de-Fonds	2–0	Fribourg
Grenchen	3–1	Servette
Old Boys	2–4	Lugano
FC Töss (Winterthur)	2–0	Vereinigten FC Winterthur-Veltheim
Zürich	2–0	Bellinzona
Brühl	5–2	SC Kleinhüningen
Kickers Luzern	1–6	Young Fellows
Nordstern	3–2	Blue Stars
Chiasso	0–0	SC Veltheim (Winterthur)

Replay

Team 1	Score	Team 2
28 November 1926
SC Veltheim (Winterthur)	1–3	Chiasso

=== Matches ===
7 November 1926

La Chaux-de-Fonds	2–0	Fribourg
Daep 74' (pen.); Ottolini 88' (2:0)	RSSSF summary

Centre Sportif de la Charrière, La Chaux-de-Fonds
- Both teams played the 1926/27 season in the Serie A (top-tier).

7 November 1926

Grenchen	3–1	Servette
Schupbach II (1:0); Schupbach II (2:0); Chiesa (3:0)	Servette summary	85' (2:1) Lüthy

Stadium Brühl, Grenchen
- Both teams played the 1926/27 season in the Serie A (top-tier).

7 November 1926

Zürich	2–0	Bellinzona
Schnorf 80' (1:0); Eggler 89' (2:0)	FCZ summary

Letzigrund, Zürich
Attendance: 1,000
Referee: (Switzerland) W. Hafner (Basel)
- Zürich played the 1926/27 season in the Serie A (top-tier), Bellinzona in the Serie B (third tier).

== Round 3 ==
=== Summary ===
Team 1	Score	Team 2
5 December 1926
Grasshopper Club	10–0	FC Töss (Winterthur)
Etoile Carouge	0–3	Bern
CS La Tour-de-Peilz	2–3	Solothurn
Young Boys	6–3	Étoile-Sporting
Nordstern	5–1	Zürich
Chiasso	1–6	Lugano
26 December 1926
La Chaux-de-Fonds	2–3 *	Grenchen
2 January 1927
Brühl	1–2	Young Fellows

- Note to match La Chaux-de-Fonds–Grenchen: Due to bad weather in La Chaux-de-Fonds, the match was played in Grenchen.

=== Matches ===
5 December 1926

Grasshopper Club	10–0	FC Töss (Winterthur)
7x Max Abegglen; 1x M. Weiler; 1x de Lavallaz; 1x W. Weiler	RSSSF summary

Sportplatz Hardturmstrasse, Zürich
- Grasshopper Club played the 1926/27 season in the Serie A (top-tier), Töss in the Serie Promotion (second tier).

5 December 1926

Etoile Carouge	0–3	Bern
	RSSSF summary	5' (0:1) Stämpfli; 55' (pen.) Ramseyer; 85' (0:3) Brand

Stade de la Fontenette, Carouge
- Both teams played the 1926/27 season in the Serie A (top-tier).

5 December 1926

CS La Tour-de-Peilz	2–3	Solothurn
Defago 60' (1:3); Gloor 70' (2:3)	RSSSF summary	20' (0:1) Jäggi I 30' (pen.); 40' (0:3)

Stade de Bel-Air, La Tour-de-Peilz
- CS La Tour-de-Peilz played the 1926/27 season in the Serie Promotion (second tier), Solothurn in the Serie A (top-tier).

5 December 1926

Young Boys	6–3	Étoile-Sporting
Fässler 5' (1:0); Wilkins 17' (2:1); Dasen 25' (3:1); Brendle; Brendle; Dasen 90' (6:3)	RSSSF summary	6' (1:1) Perrenoud; 55' Matzinger (o.g.) (Leuenberger)

Letzigrund, Zürich
- Both teams played the 1926/27 season in the Serie A (top-tier).

5 December 1926

Nordstern	5–1	Zürich
Bucco 9' (1:0); Leonhardt (2:0); Bucco (3:0); Bucco 65' (4:0); Afflerbach 69' (pen 5:1); Hossli (red card) 75'	FCZ summary	66' (4:1) Hauser

Rankhof, Basel
Attendance: 1,800
Referee: (Switzerland) Paul Ruoff (Bern)
- Both teams played the 1926/27 season in the Serie A (top-tier).

5 December 1926

Chiasso	1–6	Lugano
Perruchi 42' (1:3)	RSSSF summary	16' (0:1) Hintermann; 28' (0:2) Fink; 31' (0:3) Sturzenegger; 60' (1:4) Fink; 80' (1:5) A. Poretti; 90' (1:6) Pescini

Stadio Comunale, Chiasso
- Chiasso played the 1926/27 season in the Serie Promotion (second tier). Lugano in the Serie A (top-tier).

26 December 1926

La Chaux-de-Fonds	2–3	Grenchen
Ottolini 55' (1:3); Held 65' (2:3)	RSSSF summary	5' (pen.); 25' (0:2) Schüpbach I 35' (0:3) Schüpbach I

Stadium Brühl, Grenchen
- Due to bad weather in La Chaux-de-Fonds, the match was rescheduled from 5 December, but was played in Grenchen.
- Both teams played the 1926/27 season in the Serie A (top-tier).

2 January 1927

Brühl	1–2	Young Fellows
Niederer	RSSSF summary	Leiber; Leiber

Paul-Grüninger-Stadion, St. Gallen
- Both teams played the 1926/27 season in the Serie A (top-tier).

== Quarter-finals ==
=== Summary ===
Team 1	Score	Team 2
6 February 1927
Lugano	2–3	Grasshopper Club
Solothurn	1–2	Bern
Nordstern	1–0	Grenchen
Young Fellows	4–0	Young Boys

=== Matches ===
6 February 1927

Lugano	2–3	Grasshopper Club
Fornara 37' (1:1); Sturzenegger 38' (1:2)	RSSSF summary	10' (0:1) Max Abegglen; 55' (2:2) Tschirren; 58' (2:3) Tschirren

Campo Marzio, Lugano

6 February 1927

Solothurn	1–2	Bern
Jäggi I	RSSSF summary	Molteni; Stämpfli

Stadion FC Solothurn, Solothurn

6 February 1927

Nordstern	1–0	Grenchen
Bucco 80' (1:0)	RSSSF summary

Rankhof, Basel

6 February 1927

Young Fellows	4–0	Young Boys
Winkler 20' (1:0); Kehrli 49' (2:0); Hächler 65' (3:0); Winkler 80' (4:0)	RSSSF summary

Utogrund, Zürich

== Semi-finals ==
=== Summary ===
Team 1	Score	Team 2
6 March 1927
Nordstern	2–3 (a.e.t.)	Young Fellows
Bern	0–2	Grasshopper Club

=== Matches ===
6 March 1927

Nordstern	2–3 (a.e.t.)	Young Fellows
Bucco 7' (1:0); Leonhard 40' (2:0)	RSSSF summary	63' (2:1) Muntwyler; 85' (2:2) Heinrich; 97' (2:3) Leiber

Rankhof, Basel
Attendance: 5,000
Referee: (Switzerland) Edmond Dizerens (Lausanne)

6 March 1927

Bern	0–2	Grasshopper Club
	RSSSF summary	50' (0:1) Frankenfeldt; 76' (0:2) Max Abegglen

Stadion Neufeld, Bern
Attendance: 5,000
Referee: (Switzerland) Jacques Hirrle (Basel)

== Final ==
The final was held at the beginning of April 1927. The location for the final was decided by a toss of a coin between the two finalists. FC Young Fellows won this draw and so the final was held at their home ground, the Förrlibuck in Zürich.

=== Summary ===
Team 1	Score	Team 2
3 April 1927
Grasshopper Club	3–1	Young Fellows

=== Telegram ===
3 April 1927

Grasshopper Club	3–1	Young Fellows
Tschirren 55' (1:1); Max Abegglen 72' (2:1); W. Weiler 75' (3:1)	Fussball-Schweiz summary	46' (0:1) Muntwyler

Förrlibuck, Zürich
Attendance: 10,000
Referee: (Switzerland) Paul Ruoff (Bern)

Grasshopper Club won the cup for the second time in a row.

== Further in Swiss football ==
- 1926–27 Swiss Serie A
- 1926–27 FC Basel season

== Sources ==
- Fussball-Schweiz
- Switzerland 1926–27 at RSSSF

Preceded by 1925–26	Swiss Cup seasons	Succeeded by 1927–28
