= Italy national football team results (1910–1929) =

- Win Draw Loss

This is a list of the Italy national football team results from its origin in 1910 to 1929. During this period, Italy achieved the bronze medal at the 1928 Olympic football tournament.

== Results ==
=== 1910 ===
15 May 1910 International friendly	Italy	6–2	France	Milan, Italy
15:30 CET (UTC+01:00)	Lana 13', 59', 89' (pen.); Fossati 20'; Rizzi 66'; Debernardi 82'	Report	Bellocq 49'; Ducret 62'	Stadium: Arena Civica; Attendance: 4,000; Referee: Henry Goodley (England)

26 May 1910 International friendly	Hungary	6–1	Italy	Budapest, Hungary
16:00 CET (UTC+01:00)	Schlosser 28', 48'; Weisz 32'; Károly 69'; Dobó 74'; Korody 75'	Report	Rizzi 88'	Stadium: Millenáris Sporttelep; Attendance: 12,000; Referee: Hugo Meisl (Austria)

=== 1911 ===
6 January 1911 International friendly	Italy	0–1	Hungary	Milan, Italy
15:30 CET (UTC+01:00)		Report	Schlosser 22'	Stadium: Arena Civica; Attendance: 4,500; Referee: Henry Goodley (England)

9 April 1911^{1} International friendly	France	2–2	Italy	Saint-Ouen, France
14:30 WET (UTC±00:00)	Maës 16', 40'	Report	Rampini 33'; Boiocchi 81'	Stadium: Stade de Paris; Attendance: 1,532; Referee: Charles Barette (Belgium)

7 May 1911 International friendly	Italy	2–2	Switzerland	Milan, Italy
15:30 CET (UTC+01:00)	Carrer 31'; Boiocchi 74'	Report	Hasler 40'; E. Sydler 65'	Stadium: Arena Civica; Attendance: 4,000; Referee: Henry Goodley (England)

21 May 1911 International friendly	Switzerland	3–0	Italy	La Chaux-de-Fonds, Switzerland
15:30 CET (UTC+01:00)	Wyss 1'; H. Sydler 37'; E. Sydler 85'	Report		Stadium: Parc des Sports; Attendance: 3,500; Referee: Oscar Ledène (Belgium)

=== 1912 ===
17 March 1912^{1} International friendly	Italy	3–4	France	Turin, Italy
14:30 CET (UTC+01:00)	Rampini 24', 58'; Cevenini 47'	Report	Maës 10', 38', 66'; Mesnier 52'	Stadium: Campo Torino; Attendance: 5,000; Referee: James Stark (Scotland)

29 June 1912^{1} 1912 Summer Olympics; First round	Finland	3–2 (a.e.t.)	Italy	Stockholm, Sweden
11:00 CET (UTC+01:00)	Öhman 2'; Soinio 40'; Wiberg 105'	Report	Bontadini 10'; Sardi 25'	Stadium: Tranebergs Idrottsplats; Attendance: 600; Referee: Hugo Meisl (Austria)

1 July 1912 1912 Summer Olympics; Consolation tournament – First round	Sweden	0–1	Italy	Solna, Sweden
19:00 CET (UTC+01:00)		Report	Bontadini 15'	Stadium: Råsunda IP; Attendance: 2,500; Referee: Herbert James Willing (Netherlands)

3 July 1912 1912 Summer Olympics; Consolation tournament – Semi-final	Austria	5–1	Italy	Stockholm, Sweden
19:00 CET (UTC+01:00)	Müller 30'; Grundwald 40', 89'; Hussak 49'; Studnicka 65'	Report	Berardo 81'	Stadium: Stockholm Olympic Stadium; Attendance: 3,500; Referee: Herbert James Willing (Netherlands)

22 December 1912^{1} International friendly	Italy	1–3	Austria	Genoa, Italy
14:30 CET (UTC+01:00)	Sardi 9'	Report	Schmieger 19'; Kuthan 54'; Kohn 79'	Stadium: Stadio Marassi; Attendance: 6,000; Referee: Charles Barette (France)

=== 1913 ===
12 January 1913 International friendly	France	1–0	Italy	Saint-Ouen, France
14:30 GMT (UTC±00:00)	Maës 35'	Report		Stadium: Stade de Paris; Attendance: 3,600; Referee: Herbert James Willing (Netherlands)

1 May 1913 International friendly	Italy	1–0	Belgium	Turin, Italy
15:30 CET (UTC+01:00)	Ara 57'	Report		Stadium: Stadio Piazza d'Armi; Attendance: 6,000; Referee: Henry Goodley (England)

15 June 1913 International friendly	Austria	2–0	Italy	Vienna, Austria
15:30 CET (UTC+01:00)	Brandstätter 36', 87'	Report		Stadium: WAC-Platz; Attendance: 10,000; Referee: Akos Fehery (Hungary)

=== 1914 ===
11 January 1914^{1} International friendly	Italy	0–0	Austria	Milan, Italy
14:30 CET (UTC+01:00)		Report		Stadium: Arena Civica; Attendance: 15,000; Referee: John Howcroft (England)

29 March 1914 International friendly	Italy	2–0	France	Turin, Italy
14:30 CET (UTC+01:00)	Berardo 46'; Cevenini 89'	Report		Stadium: Campo Torino; Attendance: 15,000; Referee: Charles Barette (Belgium)

5 April 1914 International friendly	Italy	1–1	Switzerland	Genoa, Italy
15:00 CET (UTC+01:00)	Mattea 26'	Report	Wyss 32'	Stadium: Stadio Marassi; Attendance: 9,000; Referee: Charles Barette (Belgium)

17 May 1914 International friendly	Switzerland	0–1	Italy	Bern, Switzerland
15:30 CET (UTC+01:00)		Report	Barbesino 25'	Stadium: Stadion Neufeld; Attendance: 10,000; Referee: Hubert Istace (Belgium)

=== 1915 ===
31 January 1915^{1} International friendly	Italy	3–1	Switzerland	Turin, Italy
15:30 CET (UTC+01:00)	A. Cevenini 2', 54'; L. Cevenini 42' (pen.)	Report	Wyss 12'	Stadium: Stadio Piazza d'Armi; Attendance: 5,000; Referee: Edoardo Pasteur (Italy)

=== 1920 ===
18 January 1920^{1} International friendly	Italy	9–4	France	Milan, Italy
14:30 CET (UTC+01:00)	Cevenini 7', 18'; Aebi 18', 62', 70'; Brezzi 32', 52', 84'; Carcano 72'	Report	Nicolas 23'; Bard 28', 41'; Dubly 87'	Stadium: Velodromo Sempione; Attendance: 14,000; Referee: John Forster (Switzerland)

28 March 1920^{1} International friendly	Switzerland	3–0	Italy	Bern, Switzerland
15:00 CET (UTC+01:00)	Merkt 11', 70'; Kramer 59'	Report		Stadium: Stadion Neufeld; Attendance: 8,000; Referee: Johannes Mutters (Netherlands)

13 May 1920^{1} International friendly	Italy	1–1	Netherlands	Genoa, Italy
15:30 CEST (UTC+02:00)	Sardi 83'	Report	Kessler 43'	Stadium: Stadio Marassi; Attendance: 11,000; Referee: Eugène Stutz (Switzerland)

28 August 1920^{1} 1920 Summer Olympics; First round	Italy	2–1	Egypt	Ghent, Belgium
10:00 WEST (UTC+01:00)	Baloncieri 25'; Brezzi 57'	Report	Osman 30'	Stadium: Jules Ottenstadion; Attendance: 2,000; Referee: Paul Putz (Belgium)

29 August 1920 1920 Summer Olympics; Quarter-final	France	3–1	Italy	Antwerp, Belgium
15:00 WEST (UTC+01:00)	Boyer 10'; Nicolas 14'; Bard 54'	Report	Brezzi 33' (pen.)	Stadium: Olympic Stadium; Attendance: 2,000; Referee: Henri Christophe (Belgium)

31 August 1920 1920 Summer Olympics; Consolation tournament – First round	Italy	2–1 (a.e.t.)	Norway	Antwerp, Belgium
10:00 WEST (UTC+01:00)	Sardi 46'; Badini 96'	Report	Andersen 41'	Stadium: Stadion Broodstraat; Attendance: 500; Referee: Louis Fourgous (France)

2 September 1920 1920 Summer Olympics; Consolation tournament – Second round	Spain	2–0	Italy	Antwerp, Belgium
12:00 WEST (UTC+01:00)	Sesúmaga 43', 72'	Report		Stadium: Olympic Stadium; Attendance: 10,000; Referee: Paul Putz (Belgium)

=== 1921 ===
20 February 1921^{1} International friendly	France	1–2	Italy	Marseille, France
15:00 WET (UTC±00:00)	Devic 22'	Report	Cevenini 53'; Santamaria 63'	Stadium: Stade de l'Huveaune; Attendance: 10,000; Referee: John Forster (Switzerland)

6 March 1921 International friendly	Italy	2–1	Switzerland	Milan, Italy
15:00 CET (UTC+01:00)	Migliavacca 5'; Cevenini 58'	Report	Fontana 53'	Stadium: Campo di Viale Lombardia; Attendance: 12,000; Referee: Marcel Slawick (France)

5 May 1921^{1} International friendly	Belgium	2–3	Italy	Antwerp, Belgium
15:00 WET (UTC±00:00)	Larnoe 38'; Bragard 62'	Report	Migliavacca 65'; Forlivesi 80'; Ferraris 89'	Stadium: Olympic Stadium; Attendance: 12,000; Referee: Edmond Gérardin (France)

8 May 1921 International friendly	Netherlands	2–2	Italy	Amsterdam, Netherlands
14:30 NST (UTC+01:20)	van Gendt 80'; Kessler 84'	Report	Forlivesi 2'; Cevenini 49'	Stadium: Old Stadion; Attendance: 30,000; Referee: Charles Barette (Belgium)

6 November 1921^{1} International friendly	Switzerland	1–1	Italy	Geneva, Switzerland
15:00 CET (UTC+01:00)	Pache 56'	Report	Moscardini 53'	Stadium: Parc des Sports; Attendance: 12,000; Referee: Hugo Meisl (Austria)

=== 1922 ===
15 January 1922^{1} International friendly	Italy	3–3	Austria	Milan, Italy
14:45 CET (UTC+01:00)	Moscardini 16', 46'; Santamaria 26'	Report	De Vecchi 20' (o.g.); Köck 65'; Fischera 75'	Stadium: Velodromo Sempione; Attendance: 16,000; Referee: John Forster (Switzerland)

26 February 1922 International friendly	Italy	1–1	Czechoslovakia	Turin, Italy
14:30 CET (UTC+01:00)	Baloncieri 52'	Report	Janda 84'	Stadium: Motovelodromo Fausto Coppi; Attendance: 15,000; Referee: Marcel Slawick (France)

21 May 1922 International friendly	Italy	4–2	Belgium	Milan, Italy
15:30 CET (UTC+01:00)	Baloncieri 42', 58'; Moscardini 56'; Burlando 58'	Report	Larnoe 47'; Gillis 89'	Stadium: Campo di Viale Lombardia; Attendance: 16,000; Referee: Johannes Mutters (Netherlands)

3 December 1922^{1} International friendly	Italy	2–2	Switzerland	Bologna, Italy
14:30 CET (UTC+01:00)	L. Cevenini 10', 30'	Report	Pache 58'; Ramseyer 85'	Stadium: Motovelodromo; Attendance: 25,000; Referee: Heinrich Retschury (Austria)

=== 1923 ===
1 January 1923 International friendly	Italy	3–1	Germany	Milan, Italy
14:30 CET (UTC+01:00)	L. Cevenini 79'; Santamaria 85'; Migliavacca 88'	Report	Seiderer 72'	Stadium: Campo di Viale Lombardia; Attendance: 25,000; Referee: Eugène Stutz (Switzerland)

4 March 1923 International friendly	Italy	0–0	Hungary	Genoa, Italy
15:00 CET (UTC+01:00)		Report		Stadium: Stadio Marassi; Attendance: 20,000; Referee: John Forster (Switzerland)

15 April 1923 International friendly	Austria	0–0	Italy	Vienna, Austria
15:00 CET (UTC+01:00)		Report		Stadium: Hohe Warte Stadium; Attendance: 70,400; Referee: Wolf Simon Boas (Netherlands)

27 May 1923 International friendly	Czechoslovakia	5–1	Italy	Prague, Czechoslovakia
15:30 CET (UTC+01:00)	Sedláček 18', 32', 41'; Dvořáček 44'; Koželuh 80'	Report	Moscardini 52'	Stadium: Stadion Letná; Attendance: 25,000; Referee: Heinrich Retschury (Austria)

=== 1924 ===
20 January 1924^{1} International friendly	Italy	0–4	Austria	Genoa, Italy
15:00 CET (UTC+01:00)		Report	Wieser 38', 46'; Swatosch 42'; Jiszda 75'	Stadium: Stadio Marassi; Attendance: 17,000; Referee: Charles Barette (Belgium)

9 March 1924^{1} International friendly	Italy	0–0	Spain	Milan, Italy
15:15 CET (UTC+01:00)		Report		Stadium: Campo di Viale Lombardia; Attendance: 20,000; Referee: Henri Christophe (Belgium)

6 April 1924 International friendly	Hungary	7–1	Italy	Budapest, Hungary
14:30 CET (UTC+01:00)	Braun 17', 42' (pen.); Eisenhoffer 49'; Molnár 59', 60', 69'; Opata 70'	Report	L. Cevenini 76' (pen.)	Stadium: Hungária körúti Stadion; Attendance: 35,000; Referee: Max Seemann (Austria)

25 May 1924 1924 Summer Olympics; First round	Italy	1–0	Spain	Colombes, France
15:30 WEST (UTC+01:00)	Vallana 84' (o.g.)	Report		Stadium: Stade Olympique de Colombes; Attendance: 18,991; Referee: Marcel Slawick (France)

29 May 1924 1924 Summer Olympics; Second round	Italy	2–0	Luxembourg	Paris, France
14:15 WEST (UTC+01:00)	Baloncieri 20'; Della Valle 38'	Report		Stadium: Stade Pershing; Attendance: 4,254; Referee: Olivier De Ricard (France)

2 June 1924 1924 Summer Olympics; Quarter-final	Switzerland	2–1	Italy	Paris, France
17:00 WEST (UTC+01:00)	Sturzenegger 47'; Abegglen 60'	Report	Della Valle 52'	Stadium: Stade Bergeyre; Attendance: 8,359; Referee: Johannes Mutters (Netherlands)

16 November 1924^{1} International friendly	Italy	2–2	Sweden	Milan, Italy
14:30 CET (UTC+01:00)	Magnozzi 12', 54'	Report	Kaufeldt 2'; Malm 22'	Stadium: Campo di Viale Lombardia; Attendance: 25,000; Referee: Imre Vertes (Hungary)

23 November 1924 International friendly	Germany	0–1	Italy	Duisburg, Germany
14:00 CET (UTC+01:00)		Report	Janni 56'	Stadium: Wedaustadion; Attendance: 40,000; Referee: Theo van Zwieteren (Netherlands)

=== 1925 ===
18 January 1925 International friendly	Italy	1–2	Hungary	Milan, Italy
14:30 CET (UTC+01:00)	Conti 17'	Report	Spitz 27'; Takács 78'	Stadium: Campo di Viale Lombardia; Attendance: 18,000; Referee: Marcel Slawick (France)

22 March 1925 International friendly	Italy	7–0	France	Turin, Italy
14:30 CET (UTC+01:00)	Conti 4'; Baloncieri 47', 59'; Levratto 52', 88'; Moscardini 65', 78'	Report		Stadium: Stadio di Corso Marsiglia; Attendance: 15,000; Referee: Heinrich Retschury (Austria)

14 June 1925 International friendly	Spain	1–0	Italy	Valencia, Spain
16:30 WEST (UTC+01:00)	Errazquin 27'	Report		Stadium: Mestalla Stadium; Attendance: 20,000; Referee: Arthur H. Kingscott (England)

18 June 1925 International friendly	Portugal	1–0	Italy	Lisbon, Portugal
16:00 WEST (UTC+01:00)	João Francisco 39'	Report		Stadium: Estádio do Lumiar; Attendance: 15,000; Referee: Georges Theuerkauff (Belgium)

4 November 1925^{1} International friendly	Italy	2–1	Yugoslavia	Padua, Italy
14:30 CET (UTC+01:00)	Schiavio 33' (44)	Report	Bencic 29'	Stadium: Stadio Silvio Appiani; Attendance: 10,000; Referee: Eugen Braun (Austria)

8 November 1925 International friendly	Hungary	1–1	Italy	Budapest, Hungary
14:30 CET (UTC+01:00)	Molnár 76', pen.'	Report	Della Valle 21'	Stadium: Üllői úti stadion Attendance: 20,000; Referee: Marcel Slawick (France)

=== 1926 ===
17 January 1926 International friendly	Italy	3–1	Czechoslovakia	Turin, Italy
15:00 CET (UTC+01:00)	Della Valle 16'; Conti 77'; Magnozzi 89'	Report	Kristal 23'	Stadium: Motovelodromo Fausto Coppi; Attendance: 18,000; Referee: Mihály Ivanicsics (Hungary)

21 March 1926 International friendly	Italy	3–0	Republic of Ireland	Turin, Italy
15:30 CET (UTC+01:00)	Baloncieri 13'; Magnozzi 36'; Bernardini 44'	Report		Stadium: Stadio di Corso Marsiglia; Attendance: 12,000; Referee: Paul Ruoff (Switzerland)

18 April 1926 International friendly	Switzerland	1–1	Italy	Zürich, Switzerland
15:00 CET (UTC+01:00)	Ehrenbolger 19'	Report	Magnozzi 8'	Stadium: Letzigrund; Attendance: 20,000; Referee: Mihály Ivanicsics (Hungary)

9 May 1926 International friendly	Italy	3–2	Switzerland	Milan, Italy
15:30 CET (UTC+01:00)	Della Valle 11', 38'; Schiavio 17'	Report	Sturzenegger 49'; Brand 57'	Stadium: Arena Civica; Attendance: 25,000; Referee: Albert Prince-Cox (England)

18 July 1926 International friendly	Sweden	5–3	Italy	Stockholm, Sweden
16:00 CET (UTC+01:00)	Rydberg 2'; Holmberg 5'; Kroon 22'; Johansson 63', 89' (pen.)	Report	Levratto 32', 85'; L. Cevenini 57'	Stadium: Tranebergs Idrottsplats; Attendance: 12,000; Referee: Sophus Hansen (Denmark)

28 October 1926 International friendly	Czechoslovakia	3–1	Italy	Prague, Czechoslovakia
14:00 CET (UTC+01:00)	Puč 7'; Čapek 36', 52'	Report	Levratto 18'	Stadium: Stadion Slavii; Attendance: 20,000; Referee: Albert Prince-Cox (England)

=== 1927 ===
30 January 1927 International friendly	Switzerland	1–5	Italy	Geneva, Switzerland
15:00 CET (UTC+01:00)	Weiler 37'	Report	Baloncieri 13', 34', 65'; Libonatti 18'; Rossetti 40'	Stadium: Parc des Sports; Attendance: 15,000; Referee: Albert Prince-Cox (England)

20 February 1927 International friendly	Italy	2–2	Czechoslovakia	Milan, Italy
14:30 CET (UTC+01:00)	Libonatti 31'; Baloncieri 70'	Report	Puč 17'; Silný 39'	Stadium: San Siro; Attendance: 28,000; Referee: Eugen Braun (Austria)

17 April 1927 International friendly	Italy	3–1	Portugal	Turin, Italy
15:00 CET (UTC+01:00)	Levratto 20', 70'; Baloncieri 48'	Report	Cambalacho 82'	Stadium: Campo Torino; Attendance: 6,000; Referee: František Cejnar (Czechoslovakia)

24 April 1927 International friendly	France	3–3	Italy	Colombes, France
15:00 WEST (UTC+01:00)	Taisne 15', 52'; Sottiault 90'	Report	Libonatti 29', 36'; Conti 75'	Stadium: Stade Olympique Yves-du-Manoir; Attendance: 35,000; Referee: Albert Prince-Cox (England)

29 May 1927 International friendly	Italy	2–0	Spain	Bologna, Italy
16:15 CET (UTC+01:00)	Baloncieri 31'; Pachuco Prats 52' (o.g.)	Report		Stadium: Stadio Littoriale; Attendance: 60,000; Referee: Stanley Rous (England)

23 October 1927 1927–30 Central European International Cup	Czechoslovakia	2–2	Italy	Prague, Czechoslovakia
14:00 CET (UTC+01:00)	Svoboda 32', 51' (pen.)	Report	Libonatti 28', 79'	Stadium: Letná Stadium; Attendance: 12,000; Referee: John Langenus (Belgium)

6 November 1927 1927–30 Central European International Cup	Italy	0–1	Austria	Bologna, Italy
14:45 CET (UTC+01:00)		Report	Runge 44'	Stadium: Stadio Littoriale; Attendance: 30,000; Referee: Albert Prince-Cox (England)

=== 1928 ===
1 January 1928 1927–30 Central European International Cup	Italy	3–2	Switzerland	Genoa, Italy
14:40 CET (UTC+01:00)	Libonatti 10', 58'; Magnozzi 68'	Report	Abegglen 38', 60'	Stadium: Stadio Marassi; Attendance: 28,000; Referee: Stanley Rous (England)

25 March 1928 1927–30 Central European International Cup	Italy	4–3	Hungary	Rome, Italy
15:00 CET (UTC+01:00)	Conti 48', 75'; Rossetti 58'; Libonatti 85'	Report	Kohut 13'; Hirzer 48'; Takács 77'	Stadium: Stadio Nazionale PNF; Attendance: 25,000; Referee: Peco Bauwens (Germany)

15 April 1928 International friendly	Portugal	4–1	Italy	Porto, Portugal
15:30 WEST (UTC+01:00)	Mota 20', 27', 77'; Vítor Silva 57'	Report	Libonatti 38'	Stadium: Campo do Ameal; Attendance: 15,000; Referee: Henri Christophe (Belgium)

22 April 1928 International friendly	Spain	1–1	Italy	Gijón, Spain
14:00 WEST (UTC+01:00)	Félix Quesada 15' (pen.)	Report	Libonatti 66'	Stadium: Estadio Municipal El Molinón; Attendance: 20,000; Referee: René Mercet (Switzerland)

29 May 1928 1928 Summer Olympics; First round	France	3–4	Italy	Amsterdam, Netherlands
15:30 NST (UTC+01:20)	Brouzes 14', 18'; Dauphin 61'	Report	Rossetti 19'; Levratto 39'; Banchero 43'; Baloncieri 60'	Stadium: Olympic Stadium; Attendance: 25,009; Referee: Henri Christophe (Belgium)

1 June 1928 1928 Summer Olympics; Quarter-final	Italy	1–1 (a.e.t.)	Spain	Amsterdam, Netherlands
19:00 NST (UTC+01:20)	Baloncieri 63'	Report	Zaldúa 11'	Stadium: Olympic Stadium; Attendance: 3,388; Referee: Domingo Lombardi (Uruguay)

4 June 1928 1928 Summer Olympics; Quarter-final (replay)	Italy	7–1	Spain	Amsterdam, Netherlands
14:00 NST (UTC+01:20)	Magnozzi 14'; Schiavio 15'; Baloncieri 18'; Bernardini 40'; Rivolta 72'; Levratto 76', 77'	Report	Yermo 47'	Stadium: Olympic Stadium; Attendance: 4,770; Referee: Jan De Wolf (Netherlands)

7 June 1928 1928 Summer Olympics; Semi-final	Italy	2–3	Uruguay	Amsterdam, Netherlands
19:00 NST (UTC+01:20)	Baloncieri 9'; Levratto 60'	Report	Cea 17'; Campolo 28'; Scarone 31'	Stadium: Olympic Stadium; Attendance: 15,230; Referee: Willem Eijmers (Netherlands)

9 June 1928 1928 Summer Olympics; Bronze medal match	Italy	11–3	Egypt	Amsterdam, Netherlands
16:00 NST (UTC+01:20)	Schiavio 6', 42', 58'; Baloncieri 14', 52'; Banchero 19', 39', 44'; Magnozzi 72', 80', 88'	Report	Riad 12', 16'; El-Ezam 60'	Stadium: Olympic Stadium; Attendance: 6,378; Referee: John Langenus (Belgium)

14 October 1928^{1} 1927–30 Central European International Cup	Switzerland	2–3	Italy	Zürich, Switzerland
15:00 CET (UTC+01:00)	Abegglen 2'; Grimm 85'	Report	Rossetti 17', 30'; Baloncieri 80'	Stadium: Sportplatz Förrlibuck; Attendance: 20,000; Referee: Eugen Braun (Austria)

11 November 1928 International friendly	Italy	2–2	Austria	Rome, Italy
14:30 CET (UTC+01:00)	Conti 18', 44'	Report	Runge 11'; Tandler 39' (pen.)	Stadium: Stadio Nazionale PNF; Attendance: 28,000; Referee: John Langenus (Belgium)

2 December 1928 International friendly	Italy	3–2	Netherlands	Milan, Italy
14:30 CET (UTC+01:00)	Libonatti 26', 48'; Baloncieri 82'	Report	Tap 20', 35'	Stadium: San Siro; Attendance: 19,000; Referee: Eugen Braun (Austria)

=== 1929 ===
3 March 1929 1927–30 Central European International Cup	Italy	4–2	Czechoslovakia	Bologna, Italy
15:00 CET (UTC+01:00)	Rossetti 26', 61', 80'; Libonatti 33'	Report	Silný 18'; Svoboda 40'	Stadium: Stadio Littoriale; Attendance: 35,000; Referee: Henri Christophe (Belgium)

7 April 1929 1927–30 Central European International Cup	Austria	3–0	Italy	Vienna, Austria
15:00 CET (UTC+01:00)	Horvath 19', 38'; Weselik 23'	Report		Stadium: Hohe Warte Stadium; Attendance: 50,000; Referee: Prince-Cox (England)

28 April 1929 International friendly	Italy	1–2	Germany	Turin, Italy
15:00 CET (UTC+01:00)	Rossetti 6'	Report	Hornauer 12'; Frank 80'	Stadium: Stadio Filadelfia; Attendance: 30,000; Referee: E. Gray (England)

1 December 1929^{1} International friendly	Italy	6–1	Portugal	Milan, Italy
14:30 CET (UTC+01:00)	Mihalic 6', 88'; Orsi 36', 37'; Baloncieri 51'; Sallustro 77'	Report	Soares 29'	Stadium: San Siro; Attendance: 25,000; Referee: Louis Baert (Belgium)

^{1}Indicates new coach / Technical Commission
