= 1927–28 Swiss Cup =

Tournament details
- Country: Switzerland
- Teams: 101

Final positions
- Champions: Servette
- Runners-up: Grasshopper Club

The 1927–28 Swiss Cup was the 3rd edition of Switzerland's football cup competition, organised annually since the 1925–26 season by the Swiss Football Association. This competition was to be continued annually.

== Overview ==
=== Preamble ===
In Switzerland, after the end of the first world war, the 1920s saw a rapid rise in the popularity of top-level football and also a decade of rapid growth in grassroots football and many new football clubs were formed. By the mid-1920s, every larger Swiss town had a football pitch and its own football club. Top level organised football also experienced a boom and the larger already existing clubs were also expanding and growing. Between 1922 and 1930, twelve new football stadiums were built, each with a capacity of over 10,000 spectators. Furthermore, semi- and fully professional football players began to emerge and transfer fees started to become a reality.

The structure of the Swiss championships provided a top-tier Serie A with 27 teams (3 groups of 9 clubs) and a second-tier Promotion Series with 54 teams divided into 8 groups (4 groups of 8 teams, 1 group with 7 and 1 group with nine teams). From the third-tier the football system was arranged in the regional leagues, named Serie B, C and D. However, the Swiss league system was beginning to suffer a crisis and this would expand further during the following years. There were continuous disagreements between smaller and larger clubs. These were mainly concerning promotion/relegation procedures, but also due to the expanding professionalism, because the larger clubs would contest for the better players by offering them a wage.

=== Format ===
This season 101 clubs applied for participation for the Swiss Cup. Therefore, the preliminary round was expanded to 48 teams. These played a knock out for 24 slots in the first principal round. This expansion, therefore, required that selected top-tier clubs also had to compete in the preliminary round and this caused further irritations.

With one exception, this qualifying round was played on the first Sunday in September 1927, thus in advance of the domestic league season. The first principal round was played on Sunday 2 October 1927. The competition was to be completed on Sunday 25 March 1928 with the final, which this year took place at the Stade des Charmilles in Genève. Reserve teams were not admitted to the competition.

The matches were played in a knockout format. In the event of a draw after 90 minutes, the match went into extra time. In the event of a draw at the end of extra time, if agreed between the clubs, a second extra time was played. If the score was still level at the final whistle, a replay was foreseen and this was played on the visiting team's pitch. If no replay was agreed or if the replay ended in a draw after extra time, a toss of a coin would establish which team was qualified for the next round.

== Preliminary round ==
The lower league teams that had not qualified for the main competition competed here in a knockout qualification round. The aim of this preliminary stage was to reduce the number of lower league teams before the first round was played. The winners of the qualification were to join the other clubs from the top-tier that were automatically qualified. The draw in the preliminary stage and in the early rounds of the main competition respected local regionalities. The qualification round was played in advance of the lower leagues regional season.

Team 1	Score	Team 2
28 August 1927
Grenchen	13–1	FC La Neuveville
4 September 1927
Baden	2–0	Kickers Luzern
SV Seebach (Zürich)	5–7 (a.e.t.) * Abd/replayed	Wohlen
FC Bülach	5–1	Sirius Zürich
GC Luganesi	1–0	VfR Rasenspiele Basel
Chiasso	6–0	FC Horgen
Frauenfeld	8–4	FC Thalwil
FC Höngg	4–2	FC Diana Zürich
Arbon	1–0	FC Romanshorn
Luzern	7–1	Uster
FC Töss (Winterthur)	5–2	SC Kleinhüningen
FC Langenthal	4–2	FC Waedenswil
FC Adliswil	3–0	SV Schaffhausen
FC Birsfelden	4–2	FC Neumünster (ZH)
FC Liestal	3–1	Locarno
Red Star	5–2	Ballspielclub Zürich
SC Veltheim (Winterthur)	6–1	Kreuzlingen
Winterthurer SV	4–3	FC Oerlikon (ZH)
FC Münchenstein	4–0	FC Neuhausen
FC Reconvilier	4–2	FC Länggasse (Bern)
CAA Genève	2–1	FC Jonction (Genève)
Zähringia Bern	4–1	FC Bözingen
Central Fribourg	0–0	FC Viktoria Bern
Burgdorf	2–3	Stade Nyonnais
FC Yverdon	2–5	Cantonal Neuchâtel
Concordia Yverdon	7–3	Vevey Sports
Racing-Club Lausanne	4–3	Delémont
Black Stars	6–1	Helvetik Basel
FC Biberist-Derendingen	6–1	Villeneuve-Sports
FC Olten	4–0	Le Locle-Sports
Sion	3–1	Cercle des Sports Bienne
Monthey	3–1	FC Breite (Basel)
FC Renens	6–1	Thun
Couvet-Sports	7–0	CS La Tour-de-Peilz
FC Forward Morges	7–4	FC Orbe
Stade Lausanne	3–2	Montreux-Sports
FC Madretsch (Biel)	5–0	FC Tramelan
Minerva Bern	2–1	FC Allschwil
Bellinzona	FF; Awd 3–0 *	Hakoah Zürich
Sparta Schaffhausen	FF; Awd 3–0 *	SC Sankt Johann Basel

- Note to the match Seebach–Wohlen: the match was abandoned in extra time, the result annulled and the game replayed.
- Note to the match Bellinzona–Hakoah Zürich: Hakoah Zürich declaired forfeit and the match was awarded as a 3–0 victory for Bellinzona.
- Note to the match Sparta Schaffhausen–Sankt Johann: Sankt Johann declaired forfeit and the match was awarded as a 3–0 victory for Sparta Schaffhausen.

Replays

Team 1	Score	Team 2
18 September 1927
FC Viktoria Bern	3–1	Central Fribourg
25 September 1927
SV Seebach (Zürich)	2–0	Wohlen

== First principal round ==
The winners of the qualification round were to join the clubs from the lower leagues that had already qualified and the teams from the top-tier that were automatically qualified. The draw in the early rounds of the main competition respected local regionalities, whenever possible.

=== Summary ===
Team 1	Score	Team 2
2 October 1927
Young Boys	9–1	Étoile-Sporting
Grenchen	3–1	Urania Genève Sport
Aarau	5–2	Lausanne-Sport
Biel-Bienne	1–3	Servette
Zürich	3–2	Nordstern
Basel	0–1	Young Fellows
Blue Stars	5–4	Lugano
Fribourg	3–2	CAA Genève
Monthey	1–2	Etoile Carouge
FC Olten	2–0	Cantonal Neuchâtel
Stade Nyonnais	0–4	Solothurn
Racing-Club Lausanne	2–3	La Chaux-de-Fonds
Grasshopper Club	17–0	Arbon
SC Veltheim (Winterthur)	0–3	St. Gallen
Red Star	1–4	Old Boys
Vereinigten FC Winterthur-Veltheim	6–0	Baden
Concordia Basel	12–0	Bellinzona
Chiasso	6–0	FC Höngg
Brühl	6–2	SV Seebach (Zürich)
Bern	13–1	FC Biberist-Derendingen
Stade Lausanne	2–1	FC Renens
Couvet-Sports	1–2	FC Viktoria Bern
Frauenfeld	1–2	Winterthurer Sportverein
FC Madretsch (Biel)	5–0	FC Forward Morges
Concordia Yverdon	1–2	Minerva Bern
Sparta Schaffhausen	4–1	FC Adliswil
FC Liestal	5–1	FC Töss (Winterthur)
GC Luganesi	2–3	Luzern
Sion	0–9	Black Stars
FC Reconvilier	0–5	Zähringia Bern
FC Birsfelden	4–0	FC Neuhausen
Bülach	4–2	FC Langenthal

=== Matches ===
2 October 1927

Aarau	5–2	Lausanne-Sport
Goal	FCA summary	Goal

Stadion Brügglifeld, Aarau
- Both teams played the 1927/28 season in the Serie A (top-tier).

2 October 1927

Biel-Bienne	1–3	Servette
Goal	Servette summary	Jäggi IV; Lüthy; Jäggi III

Stadion Gurzelen, Biel/Bienne
- Both teams played the 1927/28 season in the Serie A (top-tier).

2 October 1927
15:15

Zürich	3–2	Nordstern
Stutz 18' (1:0); Stelzer 55' (2:0); Eggler (3:0)	FCZ summary	(3:1) Karl Breitenstein (pen.)

Letzigrund, Zürich
Referee: (Switzerland)
- Both teams played the 1927/28 season in the Serie A (top-tier).

2 October 1927
15:15

Basel	0–1	Young Fellows Zürich
	FCB summary	60' (0:1) Winkler

Landhof, Basel
Referee: (Switzerland) Edmond Dizérens (Lausanne)
- Both teams played the 1927/28 season in the Serie A (top-tier).

== Round 2 ==
=== Summary ===
Team 1	Score	Team 2
6 November 1927
FC Viktoria Bern	2–0	Black Stars
13 November 1927
Vereinigten FC Winterthur-Veltheim	1–3	Zürich
Chiasso	5–1	Blue Stars
Concordia Basel	0–2	Young Fellows
Fribourg	1–3	Aarau
La Chaux-de-Fonds	3–2	Solothurn
Old Boys	2–1 *	Winterthurer Sportverein
Young Boys	12–2	Stade Lausanne
Etoile Carouge	3–1	FC Olten
Servette	5–2	FC Madretsch (Biel)
Brühl	1–2	FC Liestal
Grasshopper Club	12–1	Bülach
FC Birsfelden	1–2	St. Gallen
Bern	9–1	Zähringia Bern
Minerva Bern	5–3	Grenchen
Sparta Schaffhausen	1–4	Luzern

- Note the match Old Boys–Winterthurer Sportverein was played in Winterthur.

=== Matches ===
13 November 1927

Vereinigten FC Winterthur-Veltheim	1–3	Zürich
Karl Kuhn 87' (1:3)	FCZ summary	18' (0:1) Eggler; 27' (0:2) Aeschlimann; 35' (pen 0:3)

Stadion Schützenwiese, Winterthur
Attendance: 2,300
Referee: (Switzerland) Stirnemann (Aarau)
- Both teams played the 1927/28 season in the Serie A (top-tier).

13 November 1927

Old Boys	2–1	Winterthurer Sportverein
Goal	Summary	Goal

Stadion Schützenwiese, Winterthur
Attendance: 2,300
Referee: (Switzerland) Stirnemann (Aarau)
- Old Boys played the 1927/28 season in the Serie A (top-tier), Winterthurer Sportverein in the Serie Promotion (second tier).

13 November 1927

Servette	5–2	FC Madretsch (Biel)
Jäggi III; Jäggi IV; Jäggi IV; Chabanel; Lüthy	Servette summary	Goal

Parc des Sports, Geneva
- Servette played the 1927/28 season in the Serie A (top-tier), Madretsch in the Serie Promotion (second tier).

13 November 1927

Fribourg	1–3	Aarau
Goal	FCA summary	Goal

Stade Saint-Léonard, Fribourg
- Both teams played the 1927/28 season in the Serie A (top-tier).

== Round 3 ==
=== Summary ===
Team 1	Score	Team 2
4 December 1927
Grasshopper Club	9–0	Chiasso
Zürich	1–4	Young Fellows
Luzern	1–2	St. Gallen
Minerva Bern	0–4	Etoile Carouge
Bern	0–4	Servette
Aarau	1–0	Young Boys
La Chaux-de-Fonds	7–0	FC Viktoria Bern
FC Liestal	2–2	Old Boys

Replay

Team 1	Score	Team 2
11 December 1927
Old Boys	FF; Awd 3–0 *	FC Liestal

- Note to match Old Boys–Liestal: Liestal declaired forfeit and the match was awarded as a 3–0 victory for Old Boys.

=== Matches ===
4 December 1927

Grasshopper Club	9–0	Chiasso
5x Max Abegglen; 2x Neuenschwander; 1x Frankenfeldt; 1x Weber	RSSSF summary

Sportplatz Hardturmstrasse, Zürich
- Both teams played the 1927/28 season in the Serie A (top-tier).

4 December 1927
14:45

Zürich	1–4	Young Fellows
Heinrich 12' (1:0)	FCZ summary	22' (1:1) Denk (1:2) Muntwyler; 60' (1:3) Muntwyler; 85' (1:4) Winkler

Letzigrund, Zürich
Attendance: 4,000
Referee: (Switzerland) Paschoud (Bern)
- Both teams played the 1927/28 season in the Serie A (top-tier).

4 December 1927

Luzern	1–2	St. Gallen
Mümheim	RSSSF summary	(pen.) Frei; Huber

Sportplatz Allmend, Lucerne
- Luzern played the 1927/28 season in the Serie Promotion (second tier), St. Gallen in the Serie A (top-tier).

4 December 1927

Minerva Bern	0–4	Etoile Carouge
	RSSSF summary	28' (0:1) Arn; 32' (0:2) A. Abegglen; 85' (0:3) Wassilieff; 87' (0:4) Arn

Spitalacker, Bern
- Minerva played the 1927/28 season in the Serie B (third tier), Etoile Carouge in the A (top-tier).

4 December 1927

Bern	0–4	Servette
	Servette summary	10' (0:1) Thurling; 35' (pen.) Jäggi IV; 63' (0:3) Bailly; 70' (0:4) Jäggi IV

Stadion Neufeld, Bern
- Both teams played the 1927/28 season in the Serie A (top-tier).

4 December 1927

Aarau	1–0	Young Boys
Wernle 20' (pen.)	FCA summary

Stadion Brügglifeld, Aarau
- Both teams played the 1927/28 season in the Serie A (top-tier).

4 December 1927

La Chaux-de-Fonds	7–0	FC Viktoria Bern
Held 4' (1:0); Mader 10' (2:2); Mader 30' (3:0); Held 57' (4:0); Mader 58' (5:0); Leuba 62' (6:0); Held 77' (7:0)	RSSSF summary

Centre Sportif de la Charrière, La Chaux-de-Fonds
- La Chaux-de-Fonds played the 1927/28 season in the Serie A (top-tier), Viktoria Bern in the Serie Promotion (second tier).

4 December 1927

FC Liestal	2–2 (a.e.t.)	Old Boys
Goal	RSSSF summary	Bossi; Lorenzelli

Sportanlage Gitterli, Liestal
- Liestal played the 1927/28 season in the Serie B (third tier), Old Boys in the Serie A (top-tier).

11 December 1927

Old Boys	FF Awd 3–0	FC Liestal
	RSSSF summary

Stadion Schützenmatte, Basel
- Liestal declaired forfeit and the match was awarded as a 3–0 victory for Old Boys who qualified for the next round.

== Quarter-finals ==
=== Summary ===
Team 1	Score	Team 2
5 February 1928
Etoile Carouge	1–3	Young Fellows
La Chaux-de-Fonds	1–0	Aarau
Old Boys	0–7	Grasshopper Club
St. Gallen	1–3	Servette

=== Matches ===
5 February 1928

Etoile Carouge	1–3	Young Fellows
Borcier 78' (1:3)	RSSSF summary	12' (0:1) Winkler; 17' (0:2) Brendle; 35' (0:3) Winkler

Stade de la Fontenette, Carouge

5 February 1928

La Chaux-de-Fonds	1–0	Aarau
Grimm 20' (1:0)	FCA summary

Parc des Sports, La Chaux-de-Fonds

5 February 1928

Old Boys	0–7	Grasshopper Club
	RSSSF summary	Goal

Stadion Schützenmatte, Basel

5 February 1928

St. Gallen	1–3	Servette
Tschumper 52' (1:1)	Servette summary	12' (0:1) Jäggi IV; 58' (1:2) Passello; 75' (1:3) Jäggi IV

Espenmoos, St. Gallen

== Semi-finals ==
=== Summary ===
Team 1	Score	Team 2
4 March 1928
La Chaux-de-Fonds	1–2	Servette
Grasshopper Club	3–1	Young Fellows

=== Matches ===
4 March 1928

La Chaux-de-Fonds	1–2	Servette
Maeder 79' (pen 1:2)	Servette summary	65' (0:1) Jäggi IV; 70' (0:2) Passello

Parc des Sports, La Chaux-de-Fonds
Attendance: 2,800
Referee: (Switzerland) Alfred Spengler (Olten)

4 March 1928

Grasshopper Club	3–1	Young Fellows
(Haag) 9' (o.g.); Frankenfeldt 72' (2:1); Max Abegglen 75' (3:1)	RSSSF summary	55' (o.g.) (Pasche)

Hardturm Sportplatz, Zürich
Attendance: 9,000
Referee: (Switzerland) René Mercet (Lausanne)

== Final ==
The final was held at the end of March 1928. The location for the final was decided by a toss of a coin between the two finalists. Servette won the draw and so the final was held at the Stade des Charmilles in Genève.

=== Summary ===
Team 1	Score	Team 2
25 March 1928
Servette	5–1	Grasshopper Club

=== Telegram ===
25 March 1928

Servette	5–1	Grasshopper Club
Bailly 12' (1:0); Jäggi IV 41' (2:1); Passello 44' (3:1); Passello 51' (4:1); Passello 80' (5:1)	Fussball-Schweiz summary summary	15' (1:1) Max Abegglen

Stade des Charmilles, Genève
Attendance: 12,000
Referee: (Switzerland) Paul Ruoff (Bern)

Servette won the cup and this was the club's first cup title. Raymond Passello was the first player to score a hat-trick in a Swiss Cup final. Grasshopper Club reached the final for the third consecutive season, so this was the first ever cup game that the team lost in the competition.

== Further in Swiss football ==
- 1927–28 Swiss Serie A
- 1927–28 FC Basel season

== Sources ==
- Fussball-Schweiz
- Switzerland 1927–28 at RSSSF

Preceded by 1926–27	Swiss Cup seasons	Succeeded by 1928–29
