= 1925–26 Swiss Cup =

Tournament details
- Country: Switzerland
- Teams: 75

Final positions
- Champions: Grasshopper Club
- Runners-up: Bern

The 1925–26 Swiss Cup was the initial edition of Switzerland's football cup tournament, organised by the Swiss Football Association and has been organised by them annually since then.

== Overview ==
=== Preamble ===
Within Switzerland, men's football began to diversify geographically and socially early on. After the turn of the century, clubs also emerged in rural regions. In 1902, 26 clubs belonged to the national association; by 1914, there were already 115 clubs with around 15,000 members. Football also spread from commercial and academic circles to broader male sections of the population and, from around 1900, also to the working class. The 1920s not only saw a rapid rise in the popularity of top-level football, but also a decade of rapid growth in grassroots football. In the interwar period, young men were gripped by a "football fever" that was repeatedly lamented in educational circles. In the first post-war season, the football section of the Swiss Football and Athletics Federation (SFAV) had 126 clubs with 20,696 members. By the 1930/31 season, this number had risen to 328 clubs with 66,966 members. After the end of the first world war, especially during the early 1920s, many new football clubs were formed. By around 1925 at the latest, every larger Swiss town seems to have had a football pitch and its own club. Top level organised football also experienced a boom. Not only were small clubs being formed, the larger already existing clubs were expanding and growing too. Between 1922 and 1930, twelve new football stadiums were built, each with a capacity of over 10,000 spectators. Semi-professional and fully professional football players began to emerge and transfer fees started to become a reality. Roughly speaking, the Swiss football movement had tripled in size in about a decade.

The period between the two World Wars is considered the heyday of Swiss football, the golden age. During this time, the Swiss national team won the silver medal at the 1924 Olympic football tournament in Paris and twice reached the quarterfinals of a World Cup. They reached the quarterfinals 1934 in Italy and 1938 in France. Particularly noteworthy was the 4–2 victory against the Greater German selection at the 1938 World Cup, which was considered by many to be part of the "spiritual defence of the country" against Hitler's aggressive policies. Switzerland also developed one of the first professional leagues in Europe, which contributed to the professionalisation of the sport. The clubs were modern and innovative, which put Swiss football on the European stage. During this period, many talented players came to the fore, including Xam Abegglen and Trello Abegglen and Severino Minelli. The golden age of Swiss football was an era of growth, success, and innovation. The combination of sporting success and the development of professional structures laid the foundation for the future development of football in Switzerland and made the country one of the most innovative in European football.

However, at this time, the Swiss league system was beginning to suffer a crisis and this would expand further during the following years. The structure of the Swiss championships provided for a Serie A with 27 teams (3 groups of 9 clubs), a Promotion Series of 54 teams (6 groups of 8 teams) and, subsequently, the regional Serie B, C and D. There were disagreements between smaller and larger clubs. For example, the smaller clubs wanted direct promotion without going through play-offs, while the larger clubs, with some professional and semi-professional players, were insisting on separating the championship from the lower leagues, in a system similar to that which had already been implemented in Italy in 1922. However, this wish was overturned and the hoped-for spectator increase failed to materialise. As time progressed, the professionalism came under criticism from various (sports) political camps. This, not least, due to financial problems within some of the clubs. The Swiss Football and Athletics Federation (SFAV), as the Swiss Football Association used to call itself, later issued a complete ban on professional players in 1941.

In the meantime, to try and relieve these uprising confrontations and the resulting awkward situation, upon the initiative of Eugen Landolt (the then President of FC Baden) the competition called Swiss Cup was organized for the season 1925–26 by the SFAV. The introduction of the tournament was approved in principle at the delegate meeting of the SFAV on 27/28 July 1924, despite opposition from the larger, top-tier clubs. The final implementation and corresponding regulations were approved a year later, on 27/28 June 1925. Seventy-five clubs participated in the first edition and the first eleven preliminary round matches were played in September 1925. The Lausanne banker Aurèle-Gilbert Sandoz (1884–1952) donated the "Sandoz Trophy," the 6.86-kilogram, 49-cm-high silver cup for the cup winner, which is still in use today.

=== Format ===
This season's cup competition began with a preliminary round, which was held in advance of the main competition. This qualifying round was played on the first Sunday in September 1925, thus at the same day as the domestic league seasons began. The first principal round was played on the first Sunday in October. The competition was to be completed on Sunday 11 April 1926 with the final, which this year took place at the Letzigrund in Zürich.

The preliminary round was held for the lower league teams that were not qualified for the main competition. Reserve teams were not admitted to the competition. The 27 clubs from this season's top-tier, the 1925–26 Serie A, joined the cup competition in the first principal round, which was played on Sunday 4 October 1925.

The matches were played in a knockout format. In the event of a draw after 90 minutes, the match went into extra time. In the event of a draw at the end of extra time, if agreed between the clubs, a second extra time was played, third extra time was not allowed. If the score was still level at the final whistle, a replay was foreseen and this was played on the visiting team's pitch. If no replay was agreed or if the replay ended in a draw after extra time, a toss of a coin would establish which team was qualified for the next round.

== Preliminary round ==
The lower league teams that had not qualified for the main competition competed here in a knockout qualification round. Reserve teams were not admitted to the competition. The aim of this preliminary stage was to reduce the number of lower league teams to 37 before the first round was played. The winners of the qualification were to join the clubs from the top-tier that were automatically qualified. The draw in the qualifying stage, and also in the early rounds of the main competition, respected local regionalities. The qualification round was played in advance of the lower leagues regional season, early in September.

Team 1	Score	Team 2
6 September 1925
Stade Nyonnais	7–2	Racing-Club Lausanne
Signal Lausanne	2–0	Concordia Yverdon
FC Viktoria Bern	0–5	FC Forward Morges
Delémont	3–0	CA Amical Genève
FC Madretsch (Biel)	0–2	FC Le Locle
Chiasso	2–3	Frauenfeld
FC Oberwinterthur (Tössfeld)	6–1	FC Langenthal
FC Horgen	2–0	SV Höngg
FC Oerlikon (ZH)	2–1	FC Neumünster Zürich
Kickers Luzern	5–0	Wohlen
Ballspielklub Zürich	0–1 FF; Awd 3–0 *	Bellinzona

- Note to match Ballspielklub–Bellinzona: The score was annulled and was awarded as a 3–0 victory for Ballspielklub Zürich, because a player of Bellinzona was not qualified.

== First principal round ==
=== Summary ===
Team 1	Score	Team 2
4 October 1925
Monthey	0–7	Cantonal Neuchâtel
Etoile Carouge	0–1	Young Boys
SV Helvetia Basel	3–4	Black Stars
Grasshopper Club	4–2	Vereinigten FC Winterthur-Veltheim
Basel	8–1	FC Horgen
FC Oerlikon (ZH)	1–4	Aarau
Montreux-Sports	2–4	Bern
Stade Nyonnais	5–3	Central Fribourg
FC Orbe	0–7	La Chaux-de-Fonds
SG Biberist-Derendingen	6–3	Cercle des Sports Bienne
Servette	7–0	FC Saint-Jean (GE)
Lausanne-Sport	9–1	Fribourg
Zähringia Bern	1–3	Signal Lausanne
Vevey Sports	0–2	FC Forward Morges
Solothurn	3–1	Grenchen
Étoile-Sporting	6–1	Minerva Bern
Delémont	0–7	FC Le Locle
Biel-Bienne	3–0	Urania Genève Sport
FC Diana Zürich	1–6	Blue Stars
Sparta Schaffhausen	2–1	Young Fellows
FC Romanshorn	2–2 (a.e.t.)	Zürich
SC Veltheim	6–1	Ballspielklub Zürich
FC Olten	0–1	Old Boys
FC Töss (Winterthur)	1–3	St. Gallen
Baden	0–3	Luzern
Concordia Basel	17–1	Kreuzlingen-Emmishofen
Kickers Luzern	2–0	SC Zug
Nordstern	17–1	Frauenfeld
FC Liestal	3–1	FC Oberwinterthur (Tössfeld)
Lugano	10–3	Arbon
Brühl	5–0	Sirius Zürich
FC Breite (Basel)	4–3	FC Buchs (AG)

Replay

Team 1	Score	Team 2
18 October 1925
Zürich	7–2	FC Romanshorn

=== Matches ===
4 October 1925

FC Oerlikon (ZH)	1–4	Aarau
Goal	FCA summary	Goal

Sportanlage Neudorf, Oerlikon
- Oerlikon played the 1925/26 season in the Serie Promotion (second-tier), Aarau in the Serie A (top-tier).

4 October 1925
15:00

Basel	8–1	FC Horgen
6x Hürzeler; 1x Strasser; 1x Wegmüller (o.g.)	FCB summary	Pfitsch

Landhof, Basel
Attendance: 1,500
Referee: (Switzerland) Ritter (La Chaux-de-Fonds)
- Basel played the 1925/26 season in the Serie A (top-tier), Horgen in the Serie Promotion (second-tier),

4 October 1925

Servette	7–0	FC Saint-Jean (GE)
3x Passello; 1x Matringe; 1x Pichler; 2x Lüthy	Servette summary

Parc des Sports, Geneva
- Servette played the 1925/26 season in the Serie A (top-tier), Saint-Jean in the Serie Promotion (second-tier),

4 October 1925

FC Romanshorn	2–2 (a.e.t.)	Zürich
Hugentobler 10' (1:0); Hugentobler 46' (2:0)	FCZ summary	30' (pen 1:1); 40' (1:1)

Sportplatz Romanshorn
Attendance: 800
Referee: (Switzerland) Weidmann (Töss)
- Romanshorn played the 1925/26 season in the Serie Promotion (second-tier), Zürich in the Serie A (top-tier)

18 October 1925

Zürich	7–2	FC Romanshorn
Schenker 5' (1:0); Mantel 7' (2:0); Hintermann; Hintermann; Hintermann; Mantel (6:2); Schenker (7:2)	FCZ summary	(2:1) Grossmann; 20' (2:2) Hugentobler

Sportplatz Hardturmstrasse, Zürich
Attendance: 1,000
Referee: (Switzerland) Ernst Meier (St. Gallen)

== Round 2 ==
=== Summary ===
Team 1	Score	Team 2
1 November 1925
Servette	5–2	Lausanne-Sport
Cantonal Neuchâtel	1–5	Young Boys
Solothurn	0–1	Étoile-Sporting
FC Le Locle	0–1	Biel-Bienne
Black Stars	0–4	Grasshopper Club
Brühl	6–0	FC Breite (Basel)
Kickers Luzern	0–3	Nordstern
Old Boys	4–6	St. Gallen
FC Liestal	1–6	Lugano
Bern	2–1	Stade Nyonnais
Signal Lausanne	2–0	FC Forward Morges
Luzern	1–2 (a.e.t.)	Concordia Basel
Zürich	8–1	SC Veltheim (Winterthur)
Basel	1–1 *	Aarau (t)
La Chaux-de-Fonds	2–1	SG Biberist-Derendingen
Blue Stars	3–2	Sparta Schaffhausen

- Note (t): Match Basel–Aarau no replay was agreed between the two teams. Aarau qualified on toss of a coin.

=== Matches ===
1 November 1925

Servette	5–2	Lausanne-Sport
Jan Zila (1:0); 3x Passello; 1x Bailly	Servette summary	Goal

Parc des Sports, Geneva
- Both teams played the 1925/26 season in the Serie A (top-tier).

1 November 1925
15:00

Zürich	8–1	SC Veltheim (Winterthur)
Schenker (1:0); Hintermann 30' (2:0); Schenker (3:0); Pfändler 48' (4:0); Schenker (5:0); Wydler (6:0); Pfändler (7:0); Schenker (8:1)	FCZ summary	(7:1) Paul Lätsch

Sportplatz Hardturmstrasse, Zürich
Attendance: 2,000
Referee: (Switzerland) Ernst Meier (St. Gallen)
- Both teams played the 1925/26 season in the Serie A (top-tier).

1 November 1925
15:00

Basel	1–1	Aarau
Hürzeler (1:0)	FCB summary	(1:1) Hürzeler

Landhof, Basel
Attendance: 1,200
Referee: (Switzerland) Fritz Beuchat Bern

After 82 minutes, with the score at 1–1, the game was interrupted due to the falling darkness. The Aarau captain Imhof demanded the game to be abandoned, due to shortsightedness of some players. Basel also requested that the game be abandoned. The referee does not accept the suggestion and after several minutes of discussion, the game continued until the end. Due to the darkness, extra time could not be played and the game should have been replayed. The two clubs could not agree to a date. The FCA was ultimately qualified on toss of a coin.

- Both teams played the 1925/26 season in the Serie A (top-tier).

== Round 3 ==
=== Summary ===
Team 1	Score	Team 2
6 December 1925
Zürich	2–3	Grasshopper Club
Signal Lausanne	0–2	Servette
Biel-Bienne	2–0	Etoile Carouge
Blue Stars	3–2	Aarau
Lugano	2–1	Nordstern
13 December 1925
St. Gallen	2–4	La Chaux-de-Fonds
20 December 1925
Brühl	8–1	Concordia Basel
3 January 1926
Young Boys	1–3	Bern

=== Matches ===
6 December 1925
14:15

Zürich	2–3	Grasshopper Club
Eggler (1:1); Schenker 50' (2:1)	FCZ summary	20' (0:1) Hofmann; 58' (2:2) M. Weiler; 60' (og 2:3) Güttinger

Letzigrund, Zürich
Attendance: 1,500
Referee: (Switzerland) Edmond Dizérens (Lausanne)
- Both teams played the 1925/26 season in the Serie A (top-tier).

6 December 1925

Signal Lausanne	0–2	Servette
	Servette summary	4' (0:1) Lüthy; 23' (0:2) Zila

- Signal Lausanne played the 1925/26 season in Serie Promotion (second-tier) Servette in the Serie A (top-tier).

6 December 1925

Blue Stars	3–2	Aarau
Tisi; Wettstein; Springer	FCA summary	Hürzeler; Treier

Hardhof, Zürich
- Both teams played the 1925/26 season in the Serie A (top-tier).

== Quarter-finals ==
=== Summary ===
Team 1	Score	Team 2
7 February 1926
Lugano	9–1	La Chaux-de-Fonds
Biel-Bienne	2–6	Grasshopper Club
Brühl	2–3	Servette
Bern	2–0	Blue Stars

=== Matches ===
7 February 1926

Lugano	9–1	La Chaux-de-Fonds
Beretta 3' (1:0); Beretta 5' (2:0); Fink (3:0); 4x Poretti; Sturzenegger 75' (8:0); Sturzenegger 86' (891)	RSSSF summary	77' (8:1) Daepp

Campo Marzio, Lugano
- Both teams played the 1925/26 season in the Serie A (top-tier).

7 February 1926

Biel-Bienne	2–6	Grasshopper Club
Buffat 44'; Strasser I	RSSSF summary	Frankenfeldt; Neuenschwander; Honegger; M. Weiler; Max Abegglen; Max Abegglen

Stadion Gurzelen, Biel/Bienne
- Both teams played the 1925/26 season in the Serie A (top-tier).

7 February 1926

Brühl	2–3	Servette
Schmid	Servette summary	Lüthy; Lüthy; Passello

Paul-Grüninger-Stadion, St. Gallen
- Both teams played the 1925/26 season in the Serie A (top-tier).

7 February 1926

Bern	2–0	Blue Stars
Motta; Motta	RSSSF summary

Stadion Neufeld, Bern
- Both teams played the 1925/26 season in the Serie A (top-tier).

== Semi-finals ==
=== Summary ===
Team 1	Score	Team 2
7 March 1926
Servette	0–1	Bern
Grasshopper Club	6–0	Lugano

=== Matches ===
7 March 1926

Servette	0–1	Bern
	Servette summary	75' (0:1) Stämpfli

Parc des Sports des Charmilles, Genève
Attendance: 5,000
Referee: (Switzerland) Felix Herren (Basel)

7 March 1926

Grasshopper Club	6–0	Lugano
Frankenfeldt 25' (pen.); Frankenfeldt 41' (pen.); Max Abegglen 42' (3:0); Max Abegglen 60' (4:0); M. Weiler 76' (5:0); Honegger 79' (6:0)	RSSSF summary

Sportplatz Hardturmstrasse, Zürich
Attendance: 3,000
Referee: (Switzerland) Jules Rutschmann (Vevey)

== Final ==
The final was held during mid April 1926. The location for the final was decided by a toss of a coin between the two finalists. Grasshopper Club won this draw and so the final was held in Zürich, however not in their own home stadium, but in the Letzigrund.

=== Summary ===
Team 1	Score	Team 2
11 April 1926
Grasshopper Club	2–1	Bern

=== Telegram ===
11 April 1926
14:30

Grasshopper Club	2–1	Bern
Honegger 17' (1:0); Max Abegglen 72' (2:0)	Fussball-Schweiz summary	83' (2:1) Küng

Letzigrund, Zürich
Attendance: 9,000
Referee: (Switzerland) Edmond Dizérens (Lausanne)

The SFAV President Jakob Schlegel presented the "Sandoz Trophy" to the first Swiss Cup tournament winner in history, the Grasshopper Club.

== Further in Swiss football ==
- 1925–26 Swiss Serie A
- 1925–26 FC Basel season

== Sources ==
- Fussball-Schweiz
- Switzerland 1925–26 at RSSSF

Preceded by Och Cup	Swiss Cup seasons	Succeeded by 1926–27
