= Forlivesi =

Forlivesi is a surname. Notable people with the surname include:

- Carlo Forlivesi (born 1971), Italian composer, performer, and researcher
- Giuseppe Forlivesi (1894–1971), Italian footballer
