= Thomas Clark (writer) =

Scottish poet and writer

- Born: 13 July 1980 (age 46); Bellshill, Scotland
- Education: University of Glasgow; University of Strathclyde
- Occupations: Poet, writer
- Writing career
- Language: Scots, English
- Website: www.thomasjclark.co.uk

Thomas Clark (born 13 July 1980) is a Scottish poet and writer. He is best known for his work in Scots language and his writing about football.

== Scots language ==
A native speaker and Scots language specialist, Clark has published several books of translations, including a Glaswegian rendering of Alice's Adventures in Wonderland and an award-winning Scots translation of Diary of a Wimpy Kid. In 2015, he released Intae the Snaw, a collection of Scots translations which was praised by writer Matthew Fitt as "Brilliant... Tammas Clark takes the bonnie broukit bairn that is the Scots and blaws new life intae the hail clamjamfrie" and by poet Rab Wilson as "an important collection that timeously re-establishes the pouer, virr an smeddum o the Scots language!"

In 2019, Clark won the first ever Scots Bairns' Book o the Year award at the inaugural Scots Language Awards. His translation of Animal Farm into Scots subsequently won the award for Scots Book o the Year in 2023.

Previously editor of Scots at Bella Caledonia, Clark is now a regular columnist at The National. In 2021, he acted as co-translator on the Scots language version of the web browser Firefox.

== Football writing ==
A former footballer, Clark was appointed Scottish football's first ever poet-in-residence in 2015, taking up a position with Lowland League side Selkirk F.C. Selkirk FC vs the World!, a collection of pieces written by Clark about the club, was published in 2016. It was followed in 2017 by a comic novel following the misadventures of a former Selkirk midfielder, Your Pal Andy.

In 2016, Clark performed O Johnny Moscardini!, his poem celebrating Scots-Italian footballer Giovanni Moscardini, ahead of the first ever Moscardini Cup football match in Barga.

== Bibliography ==
- Alice's Adventirs in Wunnerlaun (2014)
- Intae the Snaw (2015)
- Selkirk FC vs the World! (2016)
- Your Pal Andy (2017)
- Diary o a Wimpy Wean (2018)
- Peppa's Bonnie Unicorn (2019)
- Diary o a Wimpy Wean: Rodrick the Radge (2020)
- Diary o a Wimpy Wean: Up Tae The Oxters (2020)
- A Series o Scunnersome Events: The Boggin Beginnin (2021)
- Animal Fairm (2023)
- Nae Pets Allowed (2024)
