= Fritz Bucco =

Swiss footballer

Personal information
- Full name: Fritz Bucco
- Date of birth: unknown
- Place of birth: Switzerland
- Position: Striker

Youth career
- –1920: Basel

Senior career*
Years	Team	Apps	(Gls)
1920–1923	Basel	3	(1)
1926–1933	Nordstern		
- * Club domestic league appearances and goals

Fritz Bucco (date of birth unknown) was a Swiss footballer who played for FC Basel as forward in the early 1920s and for Nordstern from the late 20s into the early 1930s.

Bucco joined Basel's first team for their 1920–21 season under coach Walter Dietrich from the club's youth department. In this season he played only one friendly match, a home match in the Landhof on 8 May 1921. He scored his first goal in this same game as Basel won 4–1 against La Chaux-de-Fonds.

After playing in another test match the following season, Bucco played his domestic league debut for the club in the away game on 12 March 1922 as Basel played a 2–2 away draw against Luzern. Bucco scored his first league goal for his club one week later in the home game as Basel won 2–1 against Aarau.

In his two seasons with the club's first team Bucco played a total of five games for Basel scoring a total of two goals. Three of these games were in the Serie A and two were friendly games. He scored one goal in the domestic league and one in the test game.

The following season Bucco played for the Basel reserve team in the Serie Promotion (second tier).

In the 1926–27 season Bucco joined local rivals Nordstern and played for them in the 1926–27 Swiss Serie A. He played for them for six seasons, always in the top-tier of the Swiss football league system.

== Sources ==
- Rotblau: Jahrbuch Saison 2017/2018. Publisher: FC Basel Marketing AG. ISBN 978-3-7245-2189-1
- Die ersten 125 Jahre. Publisher: Josef Zindel im Friedrich Reinhardt Verlag, Basel. ISBN 978-3-7245-2305-5
- Verein "Basler Fussballarchiv" Homepage

(NB: Despite all efforts, the editors of these books and the authors in "Basler Fussballarchiv" have failed to be able to identify all the players, their date and place of birth or date and place of death, who played in the games during the early years of FC Basel)
