= Charles Barette =

Belgian football referee (1874–1947)

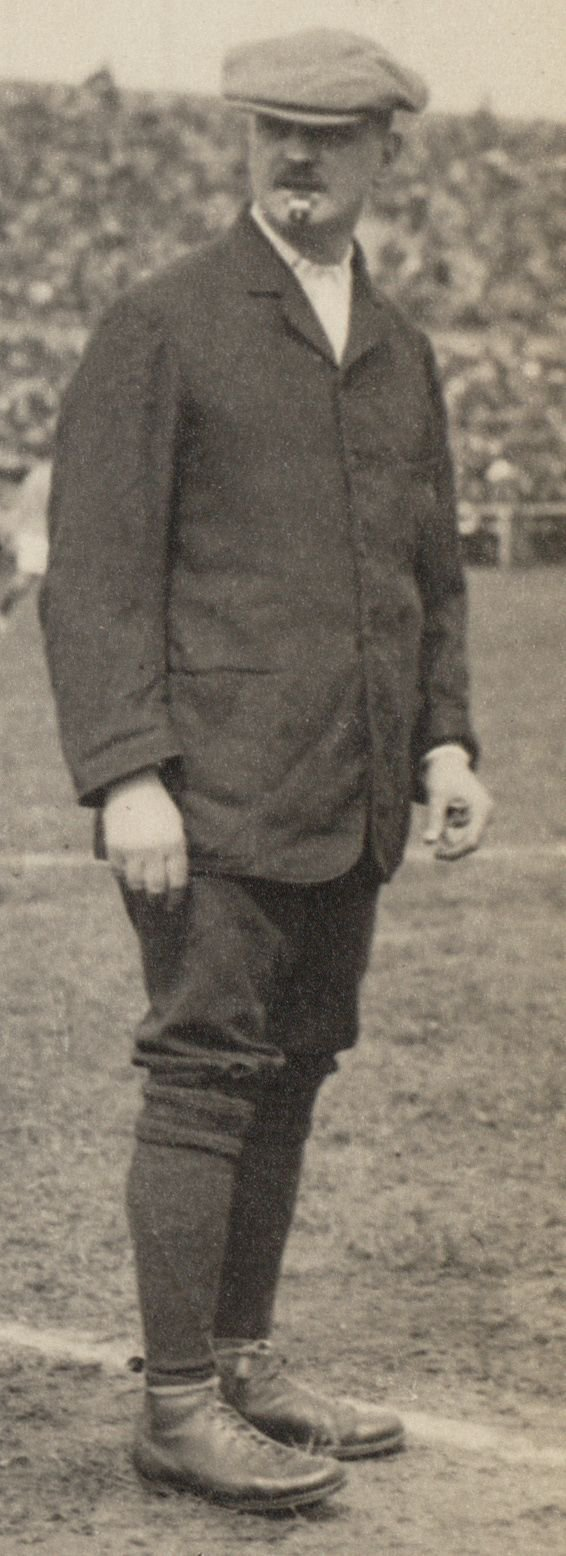
- Barette in 1921
- Born: 28 March 1874; Brussels, Belgium
- Died: 11 October 1947 (aged 73)

Domestic
Years	League	Role
1908–1925	Belgium	Referee

Charles Barette (28 March 1874 – 11 October 1947) was a Belgian football referee known for officiating several international matches in the early 20th century. Born in Brussels, he became a prominent figure in Belgian football and officiated high-profile international fixtures involving European national teams. Barette died in Saint-Gilles at the age of 73.

== Career overview ==
Charles Barette started his refereeing career in Belgium, where his officiating skills gained him recognition on both domestic and international levels. His competence on the field led to appointments in key international fixtures, especially friendly matches between prominent European teams.

== Notable international matches ==
During his career, Barette was assigned to a number of significant international matches, including:

- Sweden vs Greece on 28 August 1920 – held at the Olympisch Stadion in Antwerp during the 1920 Summer Olympics, this first-round match saw Sweden overpower Greece with a decisive 9–0 victory.
- Belgium vs Netherlands on 9 March 1924 – this friendly in Brussels saw Belgium win 1–0.
- France vs Belgium on 10 February 1929 – held in Paris, this game ended in a 4–1 victory for France.
- Belgium vs Germany on 13 April 1930 – this friendly match in Liège concluded with a 2–1 win for Germany.

== International refereeing record ==
Over his career, Barette officiated four international matches involving national teams, spanning from 1924 to 1930. His assignments included fixtures between Belgium, the Netherlands, France, and Germany, emphasizing his role in some of the prominent European rivalries of that era.

Barette's contributions to football, particularly in Belgium and through international assignments, are documented in various football records and archives, marking his place in the history of early 20th-century football officiating.
