= Kurt Pichler =

Swiss footballer (1898-1947)

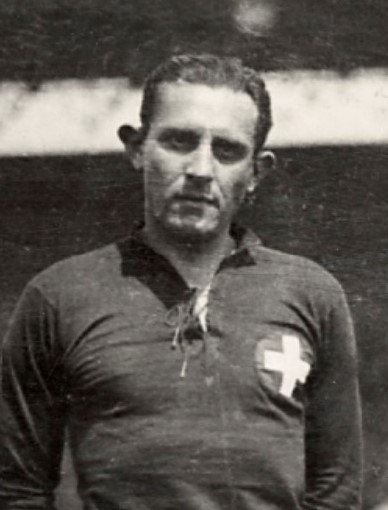
- Kurt Pichler in 1928

Personal information
- Full name: Emil Ewald Kurt Pichler
- Date of birth: 8 April 1898
- Place of birth: Berlin, Germany
- Date of death: January 1947 (aged 48)
- Place of death: Basel, Switzerland

Senior career*
Years	Team	Apps	(Gls)
1921–1931	Servette		

International career
1923–1928	Switzerland	5	(0)
- * Club domestic league appearances and goals

Kurt Pichler (8 April 1898 – January 1947) was a Swiss footballer. He competed in the men's tournament at the 1928 Summer Olympics. Pichler played 5 games for the Swiss national team.
