= Willy von Känel =

Swiss footballer (1909-1991)

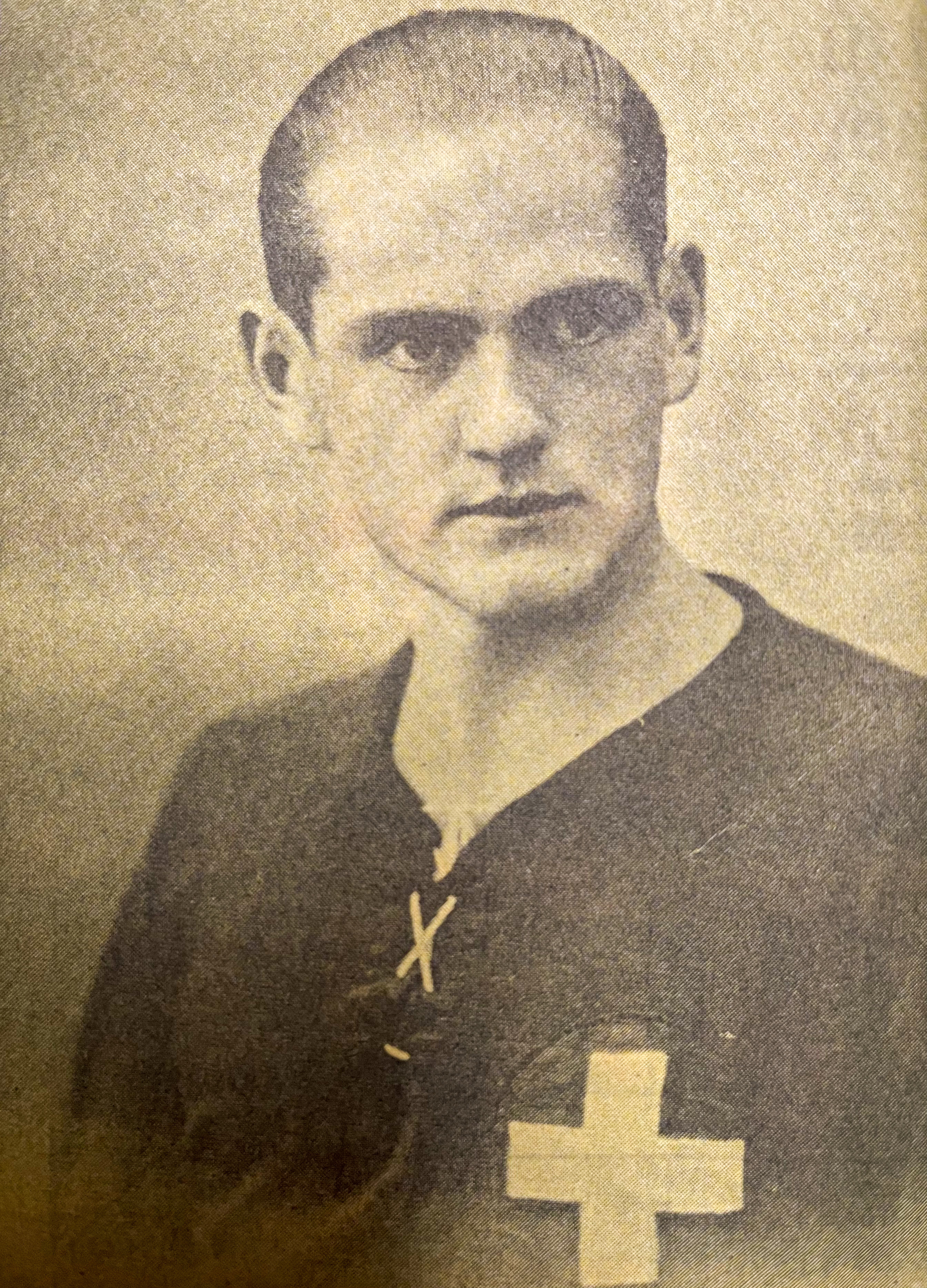

Personal information
- Date of birth: 30 October 1909
- Place of birth: La Chaux-de-Fonds, Switzerland
- Date of death: 28 April 1991 (aged 81)
- Position: Forward

Senior career*
Years	Team	Apps	(Gls)
1929–1939	FC Biel-Bienne		
1939–1941	Servette FC		

International career
1930–1934	Switzerland	19	(3)
- * Club domestic league appearances and goals

Willy von Känel (30 October 1909 – 28 April 1991) was a Swiss footballer who played for Switzerland in the 1934 FIFA World Cup. He also played for FC Biel-Bienne and Servette FC.
