= André Abegglen =

Swiss footballer (1909–1944)

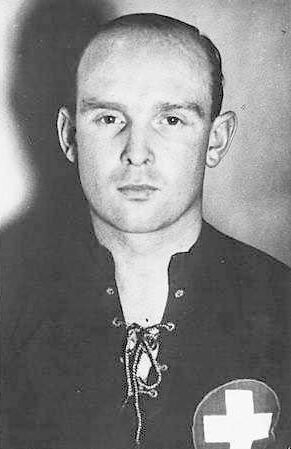
- Abegglen wearing the Swiss team uniform

Personal information
- Date of birth: 7 March 1909
- Place of birth: Neuchâtel, Switzerland
- Date of death: 8 November 1944 (aged 35)
- Place of death: Zurich, Switzerland
- Height: 1.68 m (5 ft 6 in)
- Position: Striker

Senior career*
| Years | Team | Apps | (Gls) |
| 1926–1927 | Grasshoppers | 10 | (4) |
| 1927–1928 | Etoile Carouge | 13 | (6) |
| 1928–1929 | Cantonal Neuchâtel | 14 | (8) |
| 1930–1934 | Grasshoppers | 82 | (83) |
| 1934–1937 | Sochaux | 61 | (51) |
| 1937–1942 | Servette | 103 | (63) |
| 1942–1944 | FC La Chaux-de-Fonds | 37 | (25) |
| Total | | 320 | (240) |

International career
| 1927–1943 | Switzerland | 52 | (29) |

Managerial career
- 1936: Sochaux
- 1937–1942: Servette
- 1942–1944: FC La Chaux-de-Fonds
- * Club domestic league appearances and goals

André Abegglen (7 March 1909 – 8 November 1944) was a Swiss football player and manager. As a striker he played for Grasshoppers, French club Sochaux and the Switzerland national team, for whom he appeared in two World Cups. He is the brother of Max Abegglen and Jean Abegglen, both players of the Swiss national team. He died in 1944, at the age of just 35, from sepsis contracted from a wound sustained in a train accident.

== Club career ==
In France, with Sochaux, he was the league champion in 1934–35 and 1937–38, and was the top goal-scorer of the former, with 30 goals in 28 appearances.

== International career ==
On 2 November 1930, Abbeglen scored his only hat-trick for Switzerland in a friendly against the Netherlands. He was the shared top goal scorer of the 1931–32 Central European International Cup with eight goals, alongside István Avar of Hungary. With 12 goals in the Central European International Cup, he is the third highest scorer in the competition's history, only behind Ferenc Puskas (15) and György Sárosi (17), both from Hungary. He played in the 1934 FIFA World Cup, scoring one goal, and in the 1938 FIFA World Cup, where he scored three goals against Germany, one in the round of 16 that ended in a 1–1 draw and two more in the replay, won by Switzerland 4–2. In total, he scored 29 goals in 52 matches for the Swiss team.

== Career statistics ==
Scores and results list Switzerland's goal tally first, score column indicates score after each Abegglen goal.

List of international goals scored by André Abegglen
| No. | Date | Venue | Opponent | Score | Result | Competition |
|---|---|---|---|---|---|---|
| 1 | 17 March 1929 | Olympic Stadium, Amsterdam, Netherlands | Netherlands | 3–1 | 3–2 | Friendly |
| 2 | 14 April 1929 | Stadion Wankdorf, Bern, Switzerland | Hungary | 2–1 | 4–5 | 1927–30 Central European Cup |
| 3 | 14 April 1929 | Stadion Wankdorf, Bern, Switzerland | Hungary | 3–3 | 4–5 | 1927–30 Central European Cup |
| 4 | 2 November 1930 | Letzigrund, Zurich, Switzerland | Netherlands | 1–1 | 6–3 | Friendly |
| 5 | 2 November 1930 | Letzigrund, Zurich, Switzerland | Netherlands | 4–1 | 6–3 | Friendly |
| 6 | 2 November 1930 | Letzigrund, Zurich, Switzerland | Netherlands | 6–2 | 6–3 | Friendly |
| 7 | 29 March 1931 | Stadion Wankdorf, Bern, Switzerland | Italy | 1–0 | 1–1 | 1931–32 Central European Cup |
| 8 | 12 April 1931 | Hungária körúti stadion, Budapest, Hungary | Hungary | 1–1 | 2–6 | 1931–32 Central European Cup |
| 9 | 12 April 1931 | Hungária körúti stadion, Budapest, Hungary | Hungary | 2–1 | 2–6 | 1931–32 Central European Cup |
| 10 | 29 November 1931 | Stadion Rankhof, Basel, Switzerland | Austria | 1–1 | 1–8 | 1931–32 Central European Cup |
| 11 | 20 March 1932 | Stadion Neufeld, Bern, Switzerland | France | 2–1 | 3–3 | Friendly |
| 12 | 20 March 1932 | Stadion Neufeld, Bern, Switzerland | France | 3–3 | 3–3 | Friendly |
| 13 | 17 April 1932 | Hardturm, Zurich, Switzerland | Czechoslovakia | 1–0 | 5–1 | 1931–32 Central European Cup |
| 14 | 17 April 1932 | Hardturm, Zurich, Switzerland | Czechoslovakia | 3–0 | 5–1 | 1931–32 Central European Cup |
| 15 | 19 June 1932 | Stadion Wankdorf, Bern, Switzerland | Hungary | 3–1 | 3–1 | 1931–32 Central European Cup |
| 16 | 23 October 1932 | Praterstadion, Vienna, Austria | Austria | 1–3 | 1–3 | 1931–32 Central European Cup |
| 17 | 12 March 1933 | Hardturm, Zurich, Switzerland | Belgium | 2–1 | 3–3 | Friendly |
| 18 | 12 March 1933 | Hardturm, Zurich, Switzerland | Belgium | 3–2 | 3–3 | Friendly |
| 19 | 27 May 1934 | San Siro, Milan, Italy | Netherlands | 3–1 | 3–2 | 1934 World Cup round of 16 |
| 20 | 14 April 1935 | Hardturm, Zurich, Switzerland | Hungary | 4–0 | 6–2 | 1933–35 Central European Cup |
| 21 | 14 April 1935 | Hardturm, Zurich, Switzerland | Hungary | 6–1 | 6–2 | 1933–35 Central European Cup |
| 22 | 27 October 1935 | Charmilles Stadium, Geneva, Switzerland | France | 1–1 | 2–1 | Friendly |
| 23 | 10 November 1935 | Üllői úti stadion, Budapest, Hungary | Hungary | 4–1 | 6–1 | Friendly |
| 24 | 13 March 1938 | Hardturm, Zurich, Switzerland | Poland | 3–3 | 3–3 | Friendly |
| 25 | 21 May 1938 | Hardturm, Zurich, Switzerland | England | 2–1 | 2–1 | Friendly |
| 26 | 4 June 1938 | Parc des Princes, Paris, France | Germany | 1–1 | 1–1 | 1938 World Cup round of 16 |
| 27 | 9 June 1938 | Parc des Princes, Paris, France | Germany | 3–2 | 4–2 | 1938 World Cup round of 16 replay |
| 28 | 9 June 1938 | Parc des Princes, Paris, France | Germany | 4–2 | 4–2 | 1938 World Cup round of 16 replay |
| 29 | 14 May 1939 | Stade de Sclessin, Liège, Belgium | Belgium | 1–0 | 2–1 | Friendly |

== Honours ==
Grasshoppers

- Swiss Championship: 1926–27, 1930–31
- Swiss Cup: 1926–27, 1931–32, 1933–34

Sochaux

- Ligue 1: 1934–35

Servette

- Swiss Championship: 1939–40

Individual

- French Division 1 top goalscorer: 1934–35 (30 goals)
- Central European International Cup top goalscorer: 1931–32 (8 goals)
