= Giuseppe Forlivesi =

Italian footballer

Personal information
- Date of birth: 28 March 1894
- Place of birth: Cerea, Italy
- Date of death: 3 January 1971 (aged 76)
- Place of death: Rome, Italy
- Position: Forward

Senior career*
Years	Team	Apps	(Gls)
1911–1914	Verona	31	(20)
1913–1924	Modena	118	(44)

International career
1920–1925	Italy	10	(2)

Managerial career
- 1946–1947: Pisa
- * Club domestic league appearances and goals

Giuseppe Forlivesi (Italian pronunciation: [dʒuˈzɛppe forliˈveːzi; -eːsi]; 28 March 1894 – 3 January 1971) was an Italian footballer who played as a forward. He competed for Italy in the men's football tournament at the 1920 Summer Olympics.
