= Enrico Migliavacca =

Italian footballer and manager (1901-1979)

Personal information
- Full name: Enrico Migliavacca
- Date of birth: 22 March 1901
- Place of birth: Pinerolo, Italy
- Date of death: 18 July 1979 (aged 78)
- Place of death: La Plata, Italy
- Position: Midfielder

Senior career*
Years	Team	Apps	(Gls)
1919–1920	Casale	19	(7)
1920–1922	Novara	35	(?)
1923–1934	Casale	239	(44)
1935–1937	Asti	?	(?)
1940–1941	Lanciano	2	(1)

International career
1921–1923	Italy	11	(3)

Managerial career
- 193?–1937: Asti
- 1937–1939: Casale
- 1940–1941: Lanciano
- 1942–1943: Ancona
- * Club domestic league appearances and goals

Enrico Migliavacca (Italian pronunciation: [enˈriːko miʎʎaˈvakka]; 22 March 1901 – 18 July 1979) was an Italian association football manager and footballer who played as a midfielder. He represented the Italy national football team 11 times, the first being on 20 February 1921, the occasion of a friendly match against France in a 2–1 away win.
