= Giovanni Moscardini =

Italian Scottish footballer

Personal information
- Full name: Giovanni Moscardini
- Date of birth: 1897
- Place of birth: Falkirk, Scotland
- Date of death: 15 July 1985 (aged 87–88)
- Place of death: Monkton, South Ayrshire, Scotland
- Position: Centre forward

Senior career*
| Years | Team | Apps | (Gls) |
| 1918–1919 | AS Barga | | |
| 1919–1924 | Lucchese | 51 | (40) |
| 1924–1925 | Pisa | 17 | (2) |

International career
| 1921–1925 | Italy | 9 | (7) |
- * Club domestic league appearances and goals

Giovanni Moscardini (Italian pronunciation: [dʒoˈvanni moskarˈdiːni]; 1897–1985), also known as Johnny Moscardini, was an Italian Scottish footballer who played as a forward for Lucchese, Pisa, Genoa He scored 7 goals in his 9 games for the Italy national team. Born in Falkirk, he was one of the earliest of the Oriundi. While the majority of Oriundi who played for Italy came from South America, Moscardini was the only one born in Scotland. Among tributes in his honour, the football stadium in Barga, Tuscany, is named after him.

== Early years ==
Giovanni Moscardini was born to parents Giocondo and Maria at 138 Graham's Road, Falkirk in 1897. Moscardini's family hailed from Barga. In Scotland his family established several fish-and-chip shops and ice-cream parlours. Giovanni appears on the 1901 UK census as does a brother, Umberto. In the 1911 UK census (by which time he'd be around 13 years old), Giovanni no longer appears.

== World War I ==
Italy joined World War I on 23 May 1915. Moscardini is reported enlisted in the Italian Army as a machine gunner. In the Battle of Caporetto on the Austrian front late in 1917, he was wounded in the left elbow by shrapnel. Sent to Sicily to recover, while there he helped organise a local football team.

== Football career ==
=== Club career ===
Moscardini subsequently returned to his family home of Barga. Playing football for local team AS Barga, he was spotted by a scout from Lucchese. Playing for them from 1919, Lucca (as the club were then named) in 1920–21 re-joined the Tuscany section of Prima Categoria, a predecessor Italian Football Championship to the 1929 formed Serie A. While at Lucca, in November 1921 he debuted for the Italian National Team. While with Lucca, he travelled as a guest player with Genoa CFC on their 1923 four game tour to Buenos Aires and Montevideo. He played in the last three of they games; firstly against a Combined Southern team, then in games against each of Uruguay and Argentina. He scored versus Uruguay.

After five years playing for Lucchese he switched to Pisa playing in 1924-25 Prima Divisione (from which Prima Categoria had been re-branded). An RSSSF article on Scotsmen playing in Italy credits him scoring 18 goals that season for Pisa. The RSSSF article for the Italian Football Championship that season credits him with scoring two goals.

=== International career ===
Between 1921 and 1925 Moscardini he scored 7 goals in his 9 Italy games. He scored debuting for Italy in the 1–1 draw versus Switzerland on 6 November 1921. On 15 January 1922 he scored two drawing 3–3 versus Austria. On 21 May 1922 he scored winning 4–2 versus Belgium. His fifth international goal was on 27 May 1923, losing a 5–1 at Czechoslovakia. He scored two in his last Italy game, versus France on 22 March 1925 winning 7–0. Moscardini won his first eight caps while playing for Lucchese and his last while at Pisa. He was the first Pisa player ever capped by Italy.

== Later years ==
Moscardini married his wife, Tecla Castelvecchi, in 1924 while he still played in Italy. With professional in Italian football still in its pre-Serie A infancy, he retired from football there in 1925 to focus on supporting his family. He would have been about 28 years old. He returned to Scotland that year to manage his uncle's Royal Cafe on the harbour front in Campbeltown. He played amateur football for Campbelltown Pupils AFC.

He then moved in 1928 to Monkton, South Ayrshire, to start his own business, the Lake Café at Main Street in nearby Prestwick. He fathered a daughter named Jenny born in 1929. He retired in the 1960s and died in Monkton in 1985, the year after Tecla's death. He, Tecla and Jenny are buried at Monkton and Prestwick Old Cemetery.

== Legacy ==
The Stadio Communale Johnny Moscardini in Barga bears his name. In 2016 Barga Mayor, Umberto Sereni, unveiled a photographic tribute to Moscardini outside the stadium.

Johnny Moscardini inspired a musical composition titled "Il Saluto di Giovanni Moscardini" (Johnny Moscardini's Salute). The composition is a reel for pipes and drums, brass band, strings, and percussion. It was composed by Blair Douglas. In 2016, renewed interest in Moscardini led to the creation of the Moscardini Cup, competed for by teams of writers from Scotland and Italy. The Italian team won the game 5–0 played at the Stadio Johnny Moscardini in 2016. Moscardini's years in Campbeltown are the subject of a poem by Thomas Clark, titled O Johnny Moscardini!.
