= Willy Jäggi =

Swiss footballer (1906-1968)

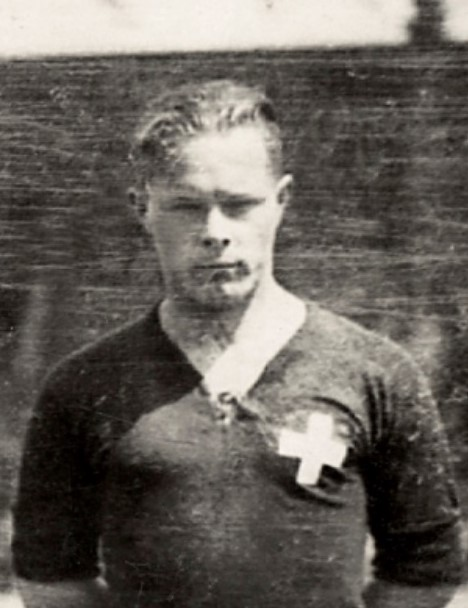
- Willy Jäggi in 1928

Personal information
- Date of birth: 28 July 1906
- Date of death: 1 February 1968 (aged 61)
- Position: Forward

Senior career*
Years	Team	Apps	(Gls)
1926–1927	FC Solothurn		
1927–1929	Servette FC		
1929–1931	FC La Chaux-de-Fonds		
1931–1933	Urania Genève Sport		
1933–1939	FC Lausanne-Sport		
1939–1940	FC Biel-Bienne		

International career
1927–1935	Switzerland	21	(13)
- * Club domestic league appearances and goals

Willy Jäggi (28 July 1906 – 1 February 1968) was a Swiss footballer who played for Switzerland in the 1934 FIFA World Cup. He also played for FC Solothurn, Servette FC, FC La Chaux-de-Fonds, Urania Genève Sport, FC Lausanne-Sport, FC Biel-Bienne and represented Switzerland at the 1928 Summer Olympics.
