= Max Brand (footballer) =

Swiss footballer (1895–1973)

Personal information
- Date of birth: 8 January 1895
- Date of death: 16 August 1973 (aged 78)
- Position: Forward

International career
Years	Team	Apps	(Gls)
1921–1927	Switzerland	10	(3)

Max Brand (8 January 1895 – 16 August 1973) was a Swiss footballer. He played in ten matches for the Switzerland national football team from 1921 to 1927. He was also part of Switzerland's squad for the football tournament at the 1928 Summer Olympics, but he did not play in any matches.
