= Max Weiler =

Swiss footballer and manager (1900-1969)

Personal information
- Full name: Maximilian Weiler
- Date of birth: 25 September 1900
- Place of birth: Winterthur, Switzerland
- Date of death: 1 September 1969 (aged 68)
- Position: Defender

Senior career*
Years	Team	Apps	(Gls)
- SC Veltheim
- Grasshopper Club Zürich

International career
1924–1936	Switzerland	37	(2)

Managerial career
- 1942–1947: FC Schaffhausen
- * Club domestic league appearances and goals

Maximilian Weiler (25 September 1900 – 1 September 1969) was a Swiss footballer who played as a defender. He played for SC Veltheim and Grasshopper Club Zürich, and also represented Switzerland at international level. He won 37 caps for his country, scoring two goals, and was part of Switzerland's 1934 FIFA World Cup squad.

After retiring from his playing career, he managed FC Schaffhausen between 1942 and 1947.
