= Edmond Bailly (footballer) =

Swiss footballer

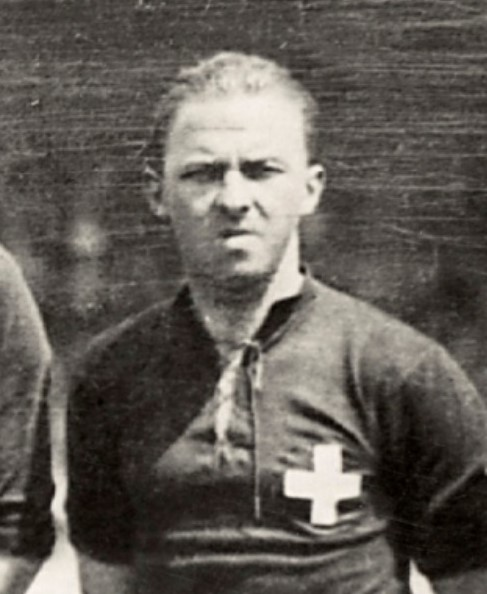
- Edmond Bailly in 1928

Personal information
- Position: Forward

Senior career*
Years	Team	Apps	(Gls)
1926–1929	Servette		

International career
1927–1928	Switzerland	7	(0)
- * Club domestic league appearances and goals

Edmond Bailly was a Swiss footballer. He competed in the men's tournament at the 1928 Summer Olympics.
