= Walter Weiler =

Swiss footballer (1903-1945)

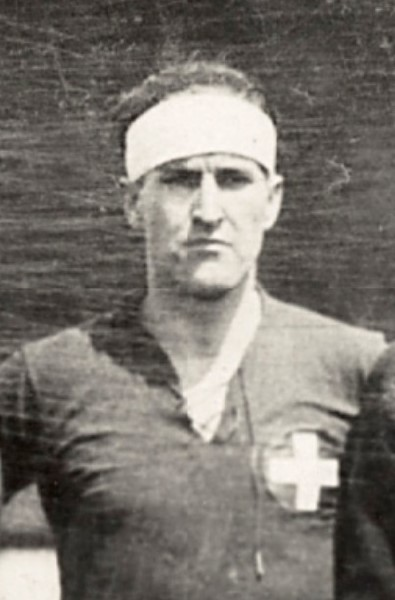
- Walter Weiler in 1928

Personal information
- Date of birth: 4 December 1903
- Place of birth: Winterthur, Switzerland
- Date of death: 4 May 1945 (aged 41)
- Place of death: Bern, Switzerland
- Position: Defender

Senior career*
Years	Team	Apps	(Gls)
–1923	SC Veltheim		
1923–1926	Le Havre AC		
1926–1943	Grasshopper Club Zürich		

International career
1926–1942	Switzerland	25	(4)
- * Club domestic league appearances and goals

Walter Weiler (4 December 1903 – 4 May 1945) was a Swiss footballer who played for Switzerland in the 1934 FIFA World Cup. He also played for Grasshopper Club Zürich. He was also in Switzerland's squads for the 1924 Summer Olympics and the 1928 Summer Olympics football tournaments, and played in the latter.
