= Max Abegglen =

Swiss footballer (1902–1970)

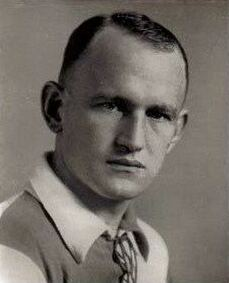
- Abegglen wearing the Grasshoppers uniform

Personal information
- Date of birth: 11 April 1902
- Place of birth: Neuchâtel, Switzerland
- Date of death: 25 August 1970 (aged 68)
- Position: Forward

Senior career*
Years	Team	Apps	(Gls)
1918–1919	FC Cantonal		
1919–1923	Lausanne-Sports		
1923–1941	Grasshoppers	142	(108)

International career
1922–1937	Switzerland	68	(34)
Medal record
Olympic Games
Men's Football
Representing Switzerland
Silver medal – second place	1924 Paris	Team competition
- * Club domestic league appearances and goals

Max "Xam" Abegglen (11 April 1902 – 25 August 1970) was a Swiss footballer who played as a forward. Throughout his career, he played for FC Lausanne until 1923 when he transferred to Grasshopper Zurich. He was the brother of André 'Trello' Abegglen and Jean Abegglen, both also players of the Swiss national team.

Abegglen played for the Switzerland national team 68 times, scoring 34 goals. He was the sole leading goal-scorer for the team until Kubilay Türkyilmaz's 34th goal in his 62nd and final international in 2001. Their records were broken on 30 May 2008 with Alexander Frei's 35th goal.

Abegglen scored a hat-trick in his first international, against the Netherlands in Bern on 19 November 1922. His only other hat-trick was on 24 May 1924 at the 1924 Summer Olympics, with three goals in a 9–0 win over Lithuania. The Swiss won the silver medal after losing the final 3–0 to Uruguay. Abegglen missed the 1934 FIFA World Cup. In his final match, he was captain as Switzerland lost 1–0 to Nazi Germany on 2 May 1937.

The club Neuchâtel Xamax, twice Swiss champions in the 1980s, is named after "Xam" Max Abegglen. He also competed at the 1924 Summer Olympics and the 1928 Summer Olympics.

== Honours ==
Grasshopper Club Zürich

- Swiss Championship: 1926–27, 1927–28, 1930–31, 1936–37, 1938–39 (5)
- Swiss Cup: 1925–26, 1926–27, 1931–32, 1933–34, 1936–37, 1937–38, 1939–40, 1940–41 (8)
