= 1926–27 Swiss Serie A =

30th season of top-tier Swiss football

Swiss Serie A
- Season: 1926–27

Statistics of Swiss Super League in the 1926–27 season.

== East ==
=== Table ===
Pos	Team	Pld	W	D	L	GF	GA	GD	Pts
1	Grasshopper Club Zürich	16	14	1	1	93	14	+79	29
2	Young Fellows Zürich	16	13	0	3	54	24	+30	26
3	FC Lugano	16	11	2	3	49	22	+27	24
4	FC Zürich	16	6	2	8	27	41	−14	14
5	FC St. Gallen	16	4	4	8	24	48	−24	12
6	Brühl St. Gallen	16	2	8	6	23	37	−14	12
7	FC Winterthur	16	4	3	9	23	41	−18	11
8	Blue Stars Zürich	16	3	4	9	33	57	−24	10
9	Sportclub Veltheim	16	3	0	13	21	63	−42	6

Source: rsssf.com

=== Results ===
Home \ Away	BSZ	BRÜ	GCZ	LUG	STG	VEL	WIN	YFZ	ZÜR
Blue Stars Zürich		3–0	1–5	3–8	2–2	6–2	2–4	0–1	3–4
Brühl	2–2		2–2	0–1	1–1	5–2	2–2	1–6	5–2
Grasshopper	9–0	7–1		4–0	12–0	6–0	9–1	3–0	5–0
Lugano	6–2	1–1	3–1		3–2	4–0	1–2	5–1	7–2
St. Gallen	2–2	1–1	2–12	0–2		4–2	4–1	1–2	2–3
Veltheim	3–4	1–2	1–5	2–5	0–1		1–0	1–7	2–1
Winterthur	3–1	1–1	0–3	1–1	1–2	2–1		0–4	3–4
Young Fellows	5–1	4–3	1–4	1–0	3–0	11–2	2–0		3–2
Zürich	1–1	1–1	2–6	0–2	1–0	0–1	3–2	1–3	

Legend: Blue = home team win; Yellow = draw; Red = away team win.

== Central ==
=== Table ===
Pos	Team	Pld	W	D	L	GF	GA	GD	Pts
1	Nordstern Basel	16	10	5	1	39	17	+22	25
2	Young Boys Bern	16	10	5	1	30	10	+20	25
3	FC Grenchen	16	8	4	4	34	22	+12	20
4	FC Basel	16	8	3	5	29	26	+3	19
5	FC Bern	16	7	4	5	38	24	+14	18
6	Old Boys Basel	16	4	4	8	23	33	−10	12
7	FC Solothurn	16	2	7	7	23	35	−12	11
8	FC Concordia Basel	16	4	1	11	17	37	−20	9
9	FC Aarau	16	2	1	13	11	40	−29	5

Source: rsssf.com

=== Results ===
Home \ Away	AAR	BAS	BER	CON	GRE	NOR	OBB	SOL	YB
Aarau		0–1	1–2	0–2	1–3	0–2	1–4	4–1	0–4
Basel	1–2		6–2	1–0	3–4	1–2	3–1	2–2	0–2
Bern	5–0	0–1		7–0	3–2	2–2	4–0	6–1	0–0
Concordia	1–0	0–1	1–2		2–2	1–4	1–0	1–2	2–0
Grenchen	2–0	5–0	4–1	6–1		0–2	1–0	2–2	0–2
Nordstern	7–0	4–1	2–1	5–2	1–1		1–1	1–1	0–0
Old Boys	3–1	1–4	1–0	3–2	1–1	3–4		3–3	0–4
Solothurn	0–1	2–4	2–2	1–0	0–1	1–2	2–2		1–2
Young Boys	3–2	1–1	1–1	3–1	3–0	2–0	1–0	2–2	

Legend: Blue = home team win; Yellow = draw; Red = away team win.

== West ==
=== Table ===
Pos	Team	Pld	W	D	L	GF	GA	GD	Pts
1	FC Biel Bienne	16	11	1	4	32	18	+14	23
2	Servette Genf	16	9	4	3	44	17	+27	22
3	Lausanne Sports	16	10	2	4	36	21	+15	22
4	Etoile Carouge	16	8	3	5	34	22	+12	19
5	Urania Geneve Sports	16	5	5	6	24	28	−4	15
6	Cantonal Neuchatel	16	4	5	7	23	32	−9	13
7	Etoile La Chaux-de-Fonds	16	4	3	9	29	38	−9	11
8	FC La Chaux-de-Fonds	16	3	5	8	22	45	−23	11
9	FC Fribourg	16	2	4	10	20	43	−23	8

Source: rsssf.com

=== Results ===
Home \ Away	BIE	CAN	CDF	ÉTC	ÉTS	FRI	LS	SER	UGS
Biel		3–1	1–2	1–0	4–2	3–1	3–2	2–3	3–0
Cantonal Neuchâtel	0–1		4–2	0–0	3–0	1–1	1–2	0–3	2–2
Chaux-de-Fonds	0–1	1–0		1–6	3–3	1–0	2–5	2–2	1–1
Étoile Carouge	0–3	5–1	3–1		2–0	7–4	1–2	2–1	0–3
Étoile-Sporting	0–3	3–3	3–1	1–2		6–0	0–1	3–3	0–3
Fribourg	2–1	0–2	2–2	1–1	3–1		1–2	0–3	0–0
Lausanne-Sports	3–1	4–3	4–0	1–1	1–2	3–0		2–0	1–1
Servette	1–1	1–1	7–0	2–0	5–0	6–1	3–2		4–0
Urania	0–2	1–2	3–3	1–3	1–5	5–1	2–1	1–0	

Legend: Blue = home team win; Yellow = draw; Red = away team win.

== Final ==
=== Table ===
Pos	Team	Pld	W	D	L	GF	GA	GD	Pts
1	Grasshopper Club Zürich	2	2	0	0	3	0	+3	4
2	Nordstern Basel	2	1	0	1	4	2	+2	2
3	FC Biel Bienne	2	0	0	2	0	5	−5	0

Source: rsssf.com

=== Results ===
Team 1	Score	Team 2
8 May 1927
Grasshopper	1–0	Bienne
15 May 1927
Nordstern	4–0	Bienne
22 May 1927
Grasshopper	2–0	Nordstern

Grasshopper Club Zürich won the championship.

== Sources ==
- Switzerland 1926-27 at RSSSF
