= Raymond Passello =

Swiss footballer (1905–1987)

Personal information
- Date of birth: 12 January 1905
- Place of birth: Geneva, Switzerland
- Date of death: 16 March 1987 (aged 82)
- Height: 1.76 m (5 ft 9 in)
- Position: Forward

Senior career*
Years	Team	Apps	(Gls)
1924–1936	Servette		

International career
1925–1934	Switzerland	17	(3)
- * Club domestic league appearances and goals

Raymond Passello (12 January 1905 – 16 March 1987) was a Swiss footballer who played as a forward for Switzerland in the 1934 FIFA World Cup. He also played for Servette. He was also part of Switzerland's squad at the 1928 Summer Olympics, but he did not play in any matches.
