= 1923–24 in Swedish football =

The 1923–24 season in Swedish football, starting August 1923 and ending July 1924:

== Honours ==
=== Official titles ===
| Title | Team | Reason |
|---|---|---|
| 1923 Swedish Champions | AIK | Winners of Svenska Mästerskapet |

=== Competitions ===
| Level | Competition | Team |
|---|---|---|
| 1st level | Division 1 Svenska Serien Östra 1923–24 | AIK |
| 1st level | Division 1 Svenska Serien Västra 1923–24 | Örgryte IS |
| 1st level | Division 1 Svenska Serien play-off 1923–24 | Örgryte IS |
| 2nd level | Division 2 Uppsvenska Serien 1923–24 | Brynäs IF |
| 2nd level | Division 2 Mellansvenska Serien 1923–24 | Västerås IK |
| 2nd level | Division 2 Östsvenska Serien 1923–24 | IK Sirius |
| 2nd level | Division 2 Västsvenska Serien 1923–24 | Fässbergs IF |
| 2nd level | Division 2 Sydsvenska Serien 1923–24 | Varbergs GIF |
| Championship Cup | Svenska Mästerskapet 1923 | AIK |

== Promotions, relegations and qualifications ==
=== Promotions ===
| Promoted from | Promoted to | Team | Reason |
|---|---|---|---|
| Division 2 Mellansvenska Serien 1923–24 | Allsvenskan 1924–25 | Västerås IK | Winners of qualification play-off |
| Unknown | Division 2 Uppsvenska Serien 1924–25 | Sandvikens IF | Unknown |
| Unknown | Division 2 Mellansvenska Serien 1924–25 | Hallstahammars SK | Unknown |
| Unknown | Division 2 Mellansvenska Serien 1924–25 | Katrineholms SK | Unknown |
| Unknown | Division 2 Mellansvenska Serien 1924–25 | Örebro IK | Unknown |
| Unknown | Division 2 Östsvenska Serien 1924–25 | IFK Nyköping | Unknown |
| Unknown | Division 2 Östsvenska Serien 1924–25 | Sundbybergs IK | Unknown |
| Unknown | Division 2 Östsvenska Serien 1924–25 | Södertälje IF | Unknown |
| Unknown | Division 2 Västsvenska Serien 1924–25 | Jonsereds IF | Unknown |
| Unknown | Division 2 Sydsvenska Serien 1924–25 | Lunds BK | Unknown |
| Unknown | Division 2 Sydsvenska Serien 1924–25 | Malmö BI | Unknown |

=== League transfers ===
| Transferred from | Transferred to | Team | Reason |
|---|---|---|---|
| Division 1 Svenska Serien Östra 1923–24 | Allsvenskan 1924–25 | AIK | Winners |
| Division 1 Svenska Serien Östra 1923–24 | Allsvenskan 1924–25 | IK Sleipner | 2nd team |
| Division 1 Svenska Serien Östra 1923–24 | Allsvenskan 1924–25 | IFK Eskilstuna | 3rd team |
| Division 1 Svenska Serien Östra 1923–24 | Allsvenskan 1924–25 | Hammarby IF | 4th team |
| Division 1 Svenska Serien Östra 1923–24 | Allsvenskan 1924–25 | IFK Norrköping | 5th team |
| Division 1 Svenska Serien Västra 1923–24 | Allsvenskan 1924–25 | Örgryte IS | Winners |
| Division 1 Svenska Serien Västra 1923–24 | Allsvenskan 1924–25 | GAIS | 2nd team |
| Division 1 Svenska Serien Västra 1923–24 | Allsvenskan 1924–25 | Helsingborgs IF | 3rd team |
| Division 1 Svenska Serien Västra 1923–24 | Allsvenskan 1924–25 | IFK Göteborg | 4th team |
| Division 1 Svenska Serien Västra 1923–24 | Allsvenskan 1924–25 | IFK Malmö | 5th team |
| Division 1 Svenska Serien Västra 1923–24 | Allsvenskan 1924–25 | Landskrona BoIS | 6th team |

=== Relegations ===
| Relegated from | Relegated to | Team | Reason |
|---|---|---|---|
| Division 1 Svenska Serien Östra 1923–24 | Division 2 Östsvenska Serien 1924–25 | Djurgårdens IF | 6th team |
| Division 2 Östsvenska Serien 1923–24 | Unknown | Östermalms IF | Unknown |

== Domestic results ==
=== Division 1 Svenska Serien Östra 1923–24 ===
Location of the participating clubs.
Västra serien. Östra serien.

| | Team | Pld | W | D | L | GF | | GA | GD | Pts |
|---|---|---|---|---|---|---|---|---|---|---|
| 1 | AIK | 10 | 6 | 2 | 2 | 29 | – | 20 | +9 | 14 |
| 2 | IK Sleipner | 10 | 6 | 0 | 4 | 16 | – | 18 | -2 | 12 |
| 3 | IFK Eskilstuna | 10 | 5 | 0 | 5 | 21 | – | 25 | -4 | 10 |
| 4 | Hammarby IF | 10 | 3 | 3 | 4 | 16 | – | 18 | -2 | 9 |
| 5 | IFK Norrköping | 10 | 3 | 2 | 5 | 14 | – | 15 | -1 | 8 |
| 6 | Djurgårdens IF | 10 | 3 | 1 | 6 | 18 | – | 18 | 0 | 7 |

=== Division 1 Svenska Serien Västra 1923–24 ===
| | Team | Pld | W | D | L | GF | | GA | GD | Pts |
|---|---|---|---|---|---|---|---|---|---|---|
| 1 | Örgryte IS | 10 | 8 | 1 | 1 | 37 | – | 11 | +26 | 17 |
| 2 | GAIS | 10 | 5 | 2 | 3 | 26 | – | 17 | +9 | 12 |
| 3 | Helsingborgs IF | 10 | 4 | 2 | 4 | 18 | – | 15 | +3 | 10 |
| 4 | IFK Göteborg | 10 | 4 | 2 | 4 | 16 | – | 17 | -1 | 10 |
| 5 | IFK Malmö | 10 | 4 | 0 | 6 | 6 | – | 25 | -19 | 8 |
| 6 | Landskrona BoIS | 10 | 0 | 3 | 7 | 8 | – | 26 | -18 | 3 |

=== Svenska Serien play-off 1923–24 ===
July 13, 1924

| AIK | 0–1 | Örgryte IS |

?, Stockholm
July 20, 1924

| Örgryte IS | 1–0 | AIK |

?, Gothenburg

=== Allsvenskan qualification play-off 1923–24 ===
June 29, 1924

| Fässbergs IF | 2–1 | Varbergs GIF |

?, Gothenburg
July 6, 1924

| Varbergs GIF | 0–1 | Fässbergs IF |

?, Varberg

June 29, 1924

| IK Sirius | 0–1 | Västerås IK |

?, Uppsala
July 6, 1924

| Västerås IK | 1–2 | IK Sirius |

?, Västerås
July 13, 1924

| Västerås IK | 3–2 | IK Sirius |

?, Stockholm

=== Division 2 Uppsvenska Serien 1923–24 ===

| | Team | Pld | W | D | L | GF | | GA | GD | Pts |
|---|---|---|---|---|---|---|---|---|---|---|
| 1 | Brynäs IF | 14 | 10 | 2 | 2 | 37 | – | 20 | +17 | 22 |
| 2 | Sandvikens AIK | 14 | 8 | 2 | 4 | 45 | – | 16 | +29 | 18 |
| 3 | Gefle IF | 14 | 6 | 3 | 5 | 32 | – | 21 | +11 | 15 |
| 4 | Skutskärs IF | 14 | 7 | 0 | 7 | 21 | – | 27 | -6 | 14 |
| 5 | Domnarvets GIF | 14 | 5 | 3 | 6 | 22 | – | 32 | -10 | 13 |
| 6 | Grycksbo IF | 14 | 5 | 2 | 7 | 15 | – | 17 | -2 | 12 |
| 7 | Avesta IF | 14 | 4 | 2 | 8 | 25 | – | 40 | -15 | 10 |
| 8 | Falu IK | 14 | 3 | 2 | 9 | 12 | – | 36 | -24 | 8 |

=== Division 2 Mellansvenska Serien 1923–24 ===
| | Team | Pld | W | D | L | GF | | GA | GD | Pts |
|---|---|---|---|---|---|---|---|---|---|---|
| 1 | Västerås IK | 12 | 5 | 5 | 2 | 22 | – | 16 | +6 | 15 |
| 2 | Katrineholms AIK | 12 | 5 | 4 | 3 | 22 | – | 16 | +6 | 14 |
| 3 | IK City | 12 | 5 | 4 | 3 | 23 | – | 18 | +5 | 14 |
| 4 | IFK Västerås | 12 | 4 | 5 | 3 | 18 | – | 15 | +3 | 13 |
| 5 | Örebro SK | 12 | 5 | 2 | 5 | 26 | – | 23 | +3 | 12 |
| 6 | Köpings IS | 12 | 4 | 4 | 4 | 24 | – | 27 | -3 | 12 |
| 7 | IFK Arboga | 12 | 1 | 2 | 9 | 11 | – | 31 | -20 | 4 |

=== Division 2 Östsvenska Serien 1923–24 ===
| | Team | Pld | W | D | L | GF | | GA | GD | Pts |
|---|---|---|---|---|---|---|---|---|---|---|
| 1 | IK Sirius | 14 | 11 | 1 | 2 | 43 | – | 20 | +23 | 23 |
| 2 | Reymersholms IK | 14 | 8 | 0 | 6 | 23 | – | 18 | +5 | 16 |
| 3 | IF Linnéa | 14 | 7 | 2 | 5 | 27 | – | 25 | +2 | 16 |
| 4 | Mariebergs IK | 14 | 7 | 1 | 6 | 22 | – | 20 | +2 | 15 |
| 5 | Westermalms IF | 14 | 6 | 1 | 7 | 19 | – | 24 | -5 | 13 |
| 6 | IFK Stockholm | 14 | 5 | 2 | 7 | 25 | – | 25 | 0 | 12 |
| 7 | Stockholms BK | 14 | 4 | 3 | 7 | 19 | – | 26 | -7 | 11 |
| 8 | Östermalms IF | 14 | 2 | 2 | 10 | 21 | – | 41 | -20 | 6 |

=== Division 2 Västsvenska Serien 1923–24 ===
| | Team | Pld | W | D | L | GF | | GA | GD | Pts |
|---|---|---|---|---|---|---|---|---|---|---|
| 1 | Fässbergs IF | 14 | 10 | 2 | 2 | 56 | – | 19 | +37 | 22 |
| 2 | IF Elfsborg | 14 | 10 | 1 | 3 | 31 | – | 14 | +17 | 21 |
| 3 | IFK Uddevalla | 14 | 8 | 1 | 5 | 30 | – | 23 | +7 | 17 |
| 4 | IK Virgo | 14 | 3 | 6 | 5 | 19 | – | 23 | -4 | 12 |
| 5 | IF Heimer | 14 | 6 | 0 | 8 | 20 | – | 29 | -9 | 12 |
| 6 | Vänersborgs IF | 14 | 4 | 2 | 8 | 16 | – | 36 | -20 | 10 |
| 7 | IFK Vänersborg | 14 | 3 | 3 | 8 | 15 | – | 27 | -12 | 9 |
| 8 | Skara IF | 14 | 3 | 3 | 8 | 13 | – | 29 | -16 | 9 |

=== Division 2 Sydsvenska Serien 1923–24 ===
| | Team | Pld | W | D | L | GF | | GA | GD | Pts |
|---|---|---|---|---|---|---|---|---|---|---|
| 1 | Varbergs GIF | 10 | 7 | 2 | 1 | 23 | – | 9 | +14 | 16 |
| 2 | Malmö FF | 10 | 6 | 3 | 1 | 20 | – | 7 | +13 | 15 |
| 3 | Halmstads BK | 10 | 5 | 2 | 3 | 16 | – | 14 | +2 | 12 |
| 4 | IFK Helsingborg | 10 | 3 | 3 | 4 | 14 | – | 17 | -3 | 9 |
| 5 | IS Halmia | 10 | 2 | 2 | 6 | 10 | – | 14 | -4 | 6 |
| 6 | Falkenbergs GIK | 10 | 1 | 0 | 9 | 7 | – | 29 | -22 | 2 |

=== Svenska Mästerskapet 1923 ===
Final

October 21, 1923

| AIK | 5–1 | IFK Eskilstuna |

Stockholms Stadion, Stockholm

== National team results ==
September 16, 1923
Friendly
№ 85

| Norway | 2–3 | Sweden |
|---|---|---|
| Wilhelms 28'; Ulrichsen 65' (p) | | Kaufeldt 52'; Kock 73'; Rydell 80' |

Gressbanen, Kristiania
Attendance: 14,000
Referee: Andersen (Denmark)

Sweden: Robert Zander - Valdus Lund, Fritjof Hillén - Ivar Klingström, Sven Friberg, Harry Sundberg - Rune Wenzel, Sven Rydell, Per Kaufeldt, Gunnar Paulsson ( Bror Carlsson), Rudolf Kock.

October 14, 1923
Friendly
№ 86

| Sweden | 1–3 | Denmark |
|---|---|---|
| Sundberg 81' (p) | | Jørgensen 20'; Nilsson 28'; Vilhelmsen 88' |

Stockholms Stadion, Stockholm
Attendance: 20,000
Referee: Robertson (Scotland)

Sweden: Sigfrid Lindberg - Valdus Lund, Fritjof Hillén - Ivar Klingström, Sven Friberg ( Gustaf Möller), Harry Sundberg - Rune Wenzel, Harry Dahl, Per Kaufeldt, Albin Dahl, Rudolf Kock.

October 28, 1923
Friendly
№ 87

| Hungary | 2–1 | Sweden |
|---|---|---|
| Eisenhoffer 11', 37' | | Detter 2' |

Stadion Üllői Út, Budapest
Attendance: 40,000
Referee: Schmieger (Austria)

Sweden: Kurt Envall - Gösta Wihlborg, Sten Mellgren (84' Valdus Lund) - Henning Helgesson, Gustaf Möller, Erik Andersson - Charles Brommesson, Harry Dahl, Olof Detter, Bertil Karlsson, Olle Ringdahl.

November 1, 1923
Friendly
№ 88

| Poland | 2–2 | Sweden |
|---|---|---|
| Staliński 3', 50' | | Dahl 15'; Helgesson 78' |

Stadion Cracovii, Kraków
Attendance: 12,000
Referee: Vértes (Hungary)

Sweden: Gunnar Karlsson - Valdus Lund, Gösta Wihlborg - Henning Helgesson, Gustaf Möller, Erik Andersson - Anders Rydén, Harry Dahl, Olof Detter (38' Charles Brommesson), Bertil Karlsson, Emil Gudmundsson.

May 18, 1924
Friendly
№ 89

| Sweden | 5–1 | Poland |
|---|---|---|
| Rydell 6', 61', 83'; Olsson 49'; Svensson 69' | | Batsch 53' |

Stockholms Stadion, Stockholm
Attendance: 14,000
Referee: Boas (Netherlands)

Sweden: Sigfrid Lindberg (50' Robert Zander) - Konrad Hirsch, Fritjof Hillén - Sven Friberg, Gunnar Holmberg, Harry Sundberg - Thorsten Svensson, Sven Rydell, Gunnar Olsson, Albin Dahl, Rudolf Kock.

May 29, 1924
1924 Olympics 1st round
№ 90

| Sweden | 8–1 | Belgium |
|---|---|---|
| Kock 8', 24', 77'; Rydell 20', 61', 83'; Brommesson 30'; Kaufeldt 46' | | Larnoe 67' |

Stade de Colombes, Paris
Attendance: 8,532
Referee: Retschury (Austria)

Sweden: Sigfrid Lindberg - Axel Alfredsson, Fritjof Hillén - Sven Friberg, Gustaf Carlson, Harry Sundberg - Charles Brommesson, Sven Rydell, Per Kaufeldt, Tore Keller, Rudolf Kock.

June 1, 1924
1924 Olympics quarter-finals
№ 91

| Sweden | 5–0 | Egypt |
|---|---|---|
| Kaufeldt 5', 71'; Brommesson 31', 34'; Rydell 49' |

Stade Pershing, Paris
Attendance: 6,484
Referee: Christophe (Belgium)

Sweden: Sigfrid Lindberg - Axel Alfredsson, Fritjof Hillén - Sven Friberg, Gustaf Carlson, Harry Sundberg - Charles Brommesson, Sven Rydell, Per Kaufeldt, Thorsten Svensson, Rudolf Kock.

June 5, 1924
1924 Olympics semi-finals
№ 92

| Switzerland | 2–1 | Sweden |
|---|---|---|
| Abegglen 14', 77' | | Kock 42' |

Stade de Colombes, Paris
Attendance: 7,448
Referee: Ivancsics (Hungary)

Sweden: Sigfrid Lindberg - Axel Alfredsson, Fritjof Hillén - Sven Friberg, Gustaf Carlson, Harry Sundberg - Charles Brommesson, Sven Rydell, Per Kaufeldt, Albin Dahl, Rudolf Kock.

June 8, 1924
1924 Olympics 3rd place match
№ 93

| Netherlands | 1–1 (aet) | Sweden |
|---|---|---|
| Le Fèvre 78' | | Kaufeldt 44' |

Stade de Colombes, Paris
Attendance: 9,915
Referee: Retschury (Austria)

Sweden: Sigfrid Lindberg - Konrad Hirsch, Sten Mellgren - Sven Lindqvist, Gustaf Carlson, Harry Sundberg - Evert Lundqvist, Sven Rydell, Per Kaufeldt, Albin Dahl, Rudolf Kock.

June 9, 1924
1924 Olympics 3rd place match
No. 94

| Sweden | 3–1 | Netherlands |
|---|---|---|
| Rydell 34', 77'; Lundqvist 42' | | Formenoy 44' (p) |

Stade de Colombes, Paris
Attendance: 40,522
Referee: Mohamed (Egypt)

Sweden: Sigfrid Lindberg - Axel Alfredsson, Fritjof Hillén - Gunnar Holmberg, Sven Friberg, Harry Sundberg - Evert Lundqvist, Sven Rydell, Per Kaufeldt, Tore Keller, Rudolf Kock.

June 15, 1924
1924–28 Nordic Championship
№ 95

| Denmark | 2–3 | Sweden |
|---|---|---|
| Olsen 2'; Nilsson 47' | | Kaufeldt 56'; Rydell 65', 74' |

Idrætsparken, Copenhagen
Attendance: 25,000
Referee: Watson (England)

Sweden: Robert Zander - Axel Alfredsson, Douglas Krook - Sven Friberg, Gustaf Carlson, Ivar Klingström - Rune Wenzel, Sven Rydell, Per Kaufeldt, Bror Carlsson, Rudolf Kock.

June 29, 1924
Friendly
№ 96

| Sweden | 5–0 | Egypt |
|---|---|---|
| Keller 13'; Rydell 19', 21', 24', 56' |

Stockholms Stadion, Stockholm
Attendance: 17,000
Referee: Hansen (Denmark)

Sweden: Sigfrid Lindberg - Axel Alfredsson, Fritjof Hillén - Ivar Klingström, Sven Friberg, Harry Sundberg - Charles Brommesson, Sven Rydell, Per Kaufeldt, Tore Keller, Rudolf Kock.

July 25, 1924
Friendly
№ 97

| Sweden | 5–2 | Estonia |
|---|---|---|
| Haglund 22'; Keller 40'; Kaufeldt 49', 89'; Kock 72' | | Üpraus 2'; Väli 47' |

Stockholms Stadion, Stockholm
Attendance: 4,000
Referee: Löfgren (Finland)

Sweden: Erik Hillerström - Carl Andersson, Justus Gustafsson - Ernst Hansson, Karl Gustafsson, Harry Sundberg - Algot Haglund, Bertil Karlsson, Per Kaufeldt, Tore Keller, Rudolf Kock.

July 28, 1924
Friendly
№ 98

| Finland | 5–7 | Sweden |
|---|---|---|
| Korma-Fallström 8', 11'; Eklöf 24'; Koponen 31'; Karjagin 43' | | Haglund 18', 89'; Kock 35' (p), 77' (p), 84' (p); Karlsson 65', 70' |

Tölö bollplan, Helsinki
Attendance: 4,000
Referee: Reinans (Estonia)

Sweden: Erik Hillerström - Carl Andersson, Sigurd Andersson - Ernst Hansson, Arvid Johansson, Bertil Nordin - Algot Haglund, Bertil Karlsson, Bror Carlsson, Tore Keller ( Ernst Lööf), Rudolf Kock.

== National team players in season 1923/24 ==
| name | pos. | caps | goals | club |
|---|---|---|---|---|
| Axel "Massa" Alfredsson | DF | 6 | 0 | Hälsingborgs IF |
| Erik "Mickel" Andersson | MF | 2 | 0 | IFK Göteborg |
| Carl "Kalle Potis" Andersson | DF | 2 | 0 | Djurgårdens IF |
| Sigurd Andersson | DF | 1 | 0 | Brynäs IF |
| Charles "Bromme" Brommesson | FW | 6 | 3 | Hälsingborgs IF |
| Gustaf "Gurra" Carlson | MF | 5 | 0 | Mariebergs IK |
| Bror "Brollan" Carlsson | FW | 3 | 0 | GAIS |
| Albin Dahl | FW | 4 | 0 | Hälsingborgs IF |
| Harry "Hacke" Dahl | FW | 3 | 1 | Landskrona BoIS |
| Olof (Olov) "Kampis" Detter | FW | 2 | 1 | IFK Vänersborg |
| Kurt Envall | GK | 1 | 0 | IFK Stockholm |
| Sven Friberg | MF | 9 | 0 | Örgryte IS |
| Emil "Keller" Gudmundsson | FW | 1 | 0 | Malmö FF |
| Justus "Negern" Gustafsson | DF | 1 | 0 | AIK |
| Karl "Köping" Gustafsson | MF | 1 | 0 | Djurgårdens IF |
| Algot "Agge" Haglund | FW | 2 | 3 | Djurgårdens IF |
| Ernst "Bagarn" Hansson | MF | 2 | 0 | Westermalms IF |
| Henning "Charmören" Helgesson | MF | 2 | 1 | Örgryte IS |
| Fritjof "Fritte" Hillén | DF | 8 | 0 | GAIS |
| Erik "Hiller" Hillerström | GK | 2 | 0 | AIK |
| Konrad Hirsch | DF | 2 | 0 | GAIS |
| Gunnar "Bajadären" Holmberg | MF | 2 | 0 | GAIS |
| Arvid Johansson | MF | 1 | 0 | Stockholms BK |
| Bertil Karlsson | FW | 4 | 2 | IFK Eskilstuna |
| Gunnar Karlsson | GK | 1 | 0 | IF Elfsborg |
| Per "Pära" Kaufeldt | FW | 10 | 8 | AIK |
| Tore Keller | FW | 5 | 2 | IK Sleipner |
| Ivar "Klinga" Klingström | MF | 4 | 0 | Örgryte IS |
| Rudolf "Putte" Kock | FW | 12 | 9 | AIK |
| Douglas "Världens bäste" Krook | DF | 1 | 0 | Örgryte IS |
| Sigfrid "Sigge" Lindberg | GK | 8 | 0 | Hälsingborgs IF |
| Sven "Linkan" Lindqvist | MF | 1 | 0 | AIK |
| Ernst Lööf | FW | 1 | 0 | Sandvikens AIK |
| Valdus "Gobben" Lund | DF | 4 | 0 | IFK Göteborg |
| Evert "Lunkan" Lundqvist | FW | 2 | 1 | Örgryte IS |
| Sten Mellgren | DF | 2 | 0 | IFK Stockholm |
| Gustaf (Gustav) Möller | MF | 3 | 0 | IFK Malmö |
| Bertil Nordin | MF | 1 | 0 | Sandvikens AIK |
| Gunnar "Lill-Gunnar" Olsson | FW | 1 | 1 | Hälsingborgs IF |
| Gunnar Paulsson | FW | 1 | 0 | GAIS |
| Olle Ringdahl | FW | 1 | 0 | IFK Norrköping |
| Sven "Trollgubben" Rydell | FW | 9 | 16 | Örgryte IS |
| Anders "Mickel" Rydén | FW | 1 | 0 | IF Heimer |
| Harry Sundberg | MF | 10 | 1 | Djurgårdens IF |
| Thorsten (Torsten) Svensson | FW | 2 | 1 | GAIS |
| Rune Wenzel | FW | 3 | 0 | GAIS |
| Gösta "Pysen" Wihlborg | DF | 2 | 0 | Hammarby IF |
| Robert Zander | GK | 3 | 0 | Örgryte IS |
