= List of footballers awarded Stora Grabbars och Tjejers Märke =

Stora grabbars och tjejers märke (lit. 'Big Boys' and Girls' Badge') or Svenska Fotbollförbundets internationella spelarmärke (lit. 'Swedish Football Association international player decoration') is an honorary award in Swedish football, awarded by the Swedish Football Association. Stora grabbars och tjejers märke are honorary awards within several Swedish sports, first named in 1928 by Bo Ekelund. To be awarded, a sportsperson has to gather a certain number of points in international (and sometimes national events) according to different rules depending on the sport in question. The recipients are called a 'Stor grabb' (lit. 'Big Boy'). When women gain the title, the recipient is called a 'Stor tjej' (lit. 'Big Girl').

== Background ==
The footballers' stor grabb was introduced in 1926 for players who had made ten international appearances.

Since 2001, the point system is based on competitive matches only.

As of 2025, 430 footballers have been awarded.

== Recipients ==
=== Men ===
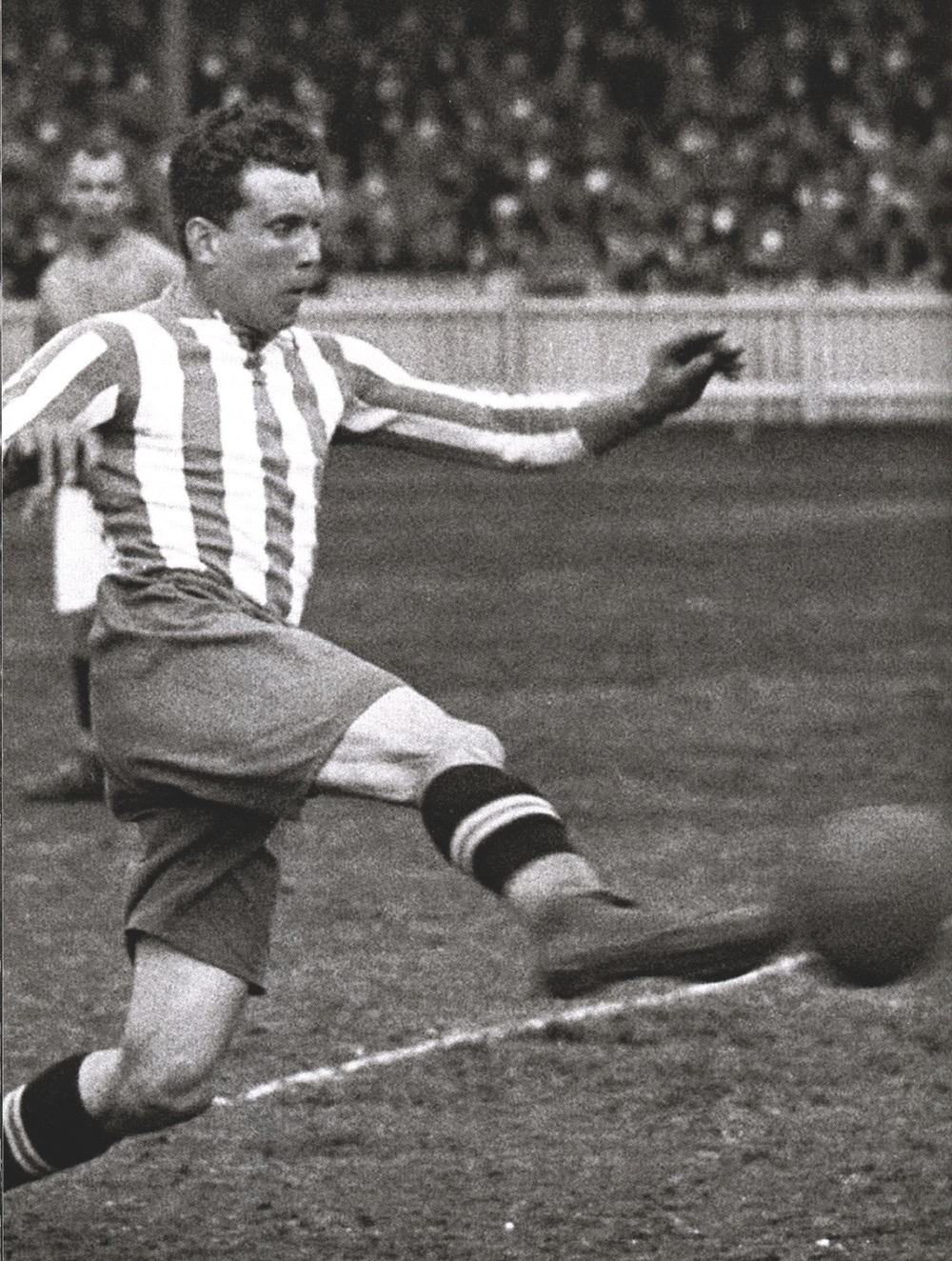
Filip Johansson was awarded Stor grabb in 1926.

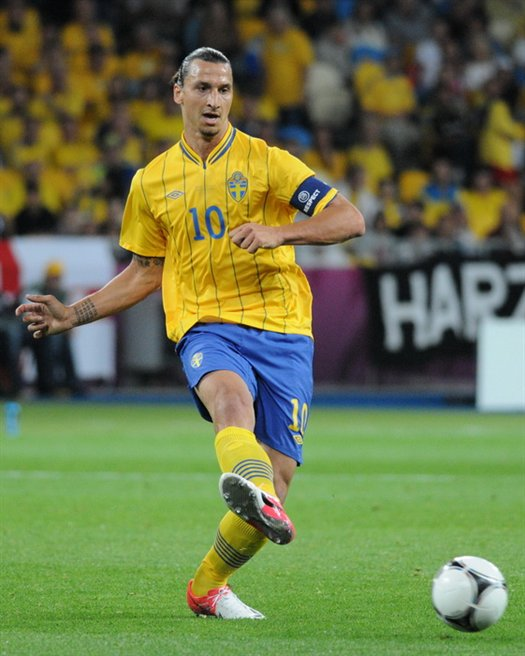
Zlatan Ibrahimović was awarded Stor grabb in 2004.

As of 17 January 2025

No	Player	Year	Club(s)
	Albert Andersson	1926	Örgryte
	Albin Dahl	1926	Landskrona, Hälsingborg
	Axel Alfredsson	1926	Helsingborg, AIK
	Bruno Lindström	1926	AIK
	Douglas Krook	1926	Örgryte
	Erik Börjesson	1926	Örgryte, IFK Göteborg, Jonsered
	Erik Hjelm	1926	IFK Göteborg
	Filip Johansson	1926	IFK Göteborg
	Fritjof Hillén	1926	GAIS
	Gustaf Carlson	1926	Marieberg
	Harry Sundberg	1926	Djurgården
	Helge Ekroth	1926	AIK
	Henning Helgesson	1926	Örgryte
	Henning Svensson	1926	IFK Göteborg
	Herbert Carlsson	1926	IFK Göteborg
	Herman Myhrberg	1926	Örgryte
	Ivar Klingström	1926	Örgryte
	Ivar Svensson	1926	IFK Norrköping, AIK
	Karl Ansén	1926	AIK
	Karl Gustafsson	1926	IFK Köping, Köpings IS, Djurgården
	Konrad Törnqvist	1926	IFK Göteborg
	Mauritz Sandberg	1926	IFK Göteborg
	Otto Malm	1926	Hälsingborg
	Per Kaufeldt	1926	AIK
	Ragnar Wicksell	1926	Djurgården
	Robert Zander	1926	Örgryte
	Putte Kock	1926	AIK
	Rune Bergström	1926	AIK, Westermalm
	Rune Wenzel	1926	GAIS
	Sigfrid Lindberg	1926	Hälsingborg
	Sven Friberg	1926	Örgryte
	Sven Rydell	1926	Örgryte, Redbergslid
	Theodor Malm	1926	AIK
	Tore Keller	1926	Sleipner
	Valdus Lund	1926	IFK Göteborg
	Albert Olsson	1927	GAIS
	Evert Lundqvist	1927	Örgryte
	Gunnar Holmberg	1927	GAIS
	Harry Dahl	1927	Hälsingborg, Landskrona
	Charles Brommesson	1928	Hälsingborg
	Gunnar Zacharoff	1928	GAIS
	Gustaf Ekberg	1928	Johanneshof, Eriksdal
	John Karlsson-Nottorp	1928	IFK Göteborg
	Knut Kroon	1928	Hälsingborg
	Knut Nilsson	1928	AIK
	Oskar Bengtsson	1928	Örgryte
	Sten Söderberg	1928	Djurgården
	Torsten Johansson	1928	IFK Norrköping
	Carl-Erik Holmberg	1929	Örgryte
	Werner Andersson	1929	IFK Göteborg
	Åke Hansson	1929	IFK Göteborg, Redbergslid
	Ernst Lööf	1930	Sandvikens AIK
	Herbert Lundgren	1930	GAIS
	Anders Rydberg	1931	IFK Göteborg
	Einar Snitt	1931	Sandvikens IF
	Harry Lundahl	1931	Hälsingborg, IFK Eskilstuna
	John Nilsson	1931	AIK
	Nils Rosén	1931	Hälsingborg
	Thure Svensson	1931	Gefle
	Arne Johansson	1932	Hälsingborg
	Evert Hansson	1932	Örgryte
	Gunnar Olsson	1932	Hälsingborg
	Gösta Dunker	1932	Sandvikens IF
	Helge Liljebjörn	1932	GAIS
	Herbert Samuelsson	1932	IFK Göteborg, Halmia
	John Sundberg	1932	Sandvikens AIK, Åtvidaberg
	Ernst Andersson	1933	IFK Göteborg
	Gunnar Rydberg	1933	IFK Göteborg
	Sven Andersson	1933	AIK
	Erik Persson	1934	AIK
	Nils Axelsson	1934	Hälsingborg
	Otto Andersson	1934	Örgryte
	Fritz Berg	1935	IFK Göteborg
	Sven Jonasson	1935	Elfsborg
	Karl-Erik Grahn	1936	Elfsborg
	Sven Bergqvist	1936	Hammarby
	Victor Carlund	1936	Örgryte
	Åke Hallman	1936	IFK Norrköping
	Bertil Ericsson	1937	Sandvikens IF
	Gustaf Josefsson	1937	AIK
	Lennart Bunke	1937	Hälsingborg
	Arne Nyberg	1938	IFK Göteborg
	Erik Almgren	1938	AIK
	Olle Källgren	1938	Sandvikens IF
	Arvid Emanuelsson	1939	Elfsborg
	Gunnar Bergström	1939	Brage
	Kurt Svanström	1939	Örgryte
	Erik Källström	1940	Elfsborg
	Gustav Sjöberg	1940	AIK
	Harry Nilsson	1940	Landskrona, AIK
	Åke Andersson	1941	GAIS, AIK
	Erik Persson	1942	Landskrona
	Erik Nilsson	1943	Malmö FF
	Gunnar Gren	1943	Gårda, IFK Göteborg, Örgryte
	Henry Carlsson	1943	AIK
	Malte Mårtensson	1943	Hälsingborg
	Erik Holmqvist	1945	IFK Norrköping
	Gunnar Nordahl	1945	Degerfors, IFK Norrköping
	Harry Johansson	1945	GAIS, Gårda
	Börje Leander	1946	AIK
	Knut Johansson	1946	Elfsborg
	Olle Åhlund	1946	Degerfors
	Ragnar Gustavsson	1946	GAIS
	Valfrid Persson	1946	Sandvikens IF, Karlskoga
	Knut Nordahl	1947	IFK Norrköping
	Stellan Nilsson	1947	Malmö FF
	Stig Nyström	1947	Brage, Djurgården
	Bertil Nordahl	1948	Degerfors
	Kjell Rosén	1948	Malmö FF
	Nils Liedholm	1948	IFK Norrköping, Milan
	Sune Andersson	1948	AIK
	Torsten Lindberg	1948	IFK Norrköping
	Birger Rosengren	1949	IFK Norrköping
	Karl-Erik Palmér	1950	Malmö FF
	Egon Jönsson	1950	Malmö FF
	Hasse Jeppson	1950	Djurgården
	Kalle Svensson	1950	Hälsingborg
	Rune Emanuelsson	1951	IFK Göteborg
	Bengt Gustavsson	1952	IFK Norrköping, Åtvidaberg, Atalanta
	Gösta Lindh	1952	Örebro SK
	Gösta Löfgren	1952	Motala, IFK Norrköping
	Gösta Sandberg	1952	Djurgården
	Ingvar Rydell	1952	Malmö FF
	Lennart Samuelsson	1952	Elfsborg
	Sylve Bengtsson	1952	Hälsingborg, Halmstad
	Yngve Brodd	1952	Örebro SK, Toulouse, IFK Göteborg
	Hans Malmström	1953	Malmö FF, Hälsingborg
	Orvar Bergmark	1953	Örebro SK, AIK, Roma
	Sven Hjertsson	1953	Malmö FF
	Henry Thillberg	1954	Malmö FF
	Karl-Erik Andersson	1954	Djurgården
	Kurt Hamrin	1954	AIK, Padova, Fiorentina
	Nils-Åke Sandell	1954	Malmö FF, Lund
	Sven-Ove Svensson	1954	Hälsingborg
	Sigge Parling	1956	Djurgården, Lycksele
	Stig Sundqvist	1956	IFK Norrköping
	Sven Axbom	1957	IFK Norrköping
	Åke Johansson	1957	IFK Norrköping
	Agne Simonsson	1958	Örgryte, Real Madrid, Real Sociedad
	Henry Källgren	1958	IFK Norrköping
	Holger Hansson	1958	IFK Göteborg
	Lennart Skoglund	1958	AIK, Inter Milan, Hammarby
	Reino Börjesson	1958	IFK Göteborg, Norrby
	Torbjörn Jonsson	1958	IFK Norrköping, Real Betis, Fiorentina
	Bengt Berndtsson	1959	IFK Göteborg
	Bengt Nyholm	1960	IFK Norrköping
	John Eriksson	1960	Djurgården
	Lennart Backman	1960	IFK Norrköping, AIK
	Rune Börjesson	1960	Örgryte
	Åke Jönsson	1960	Hälsingborg
	Arne Arvidsson	1962	Djurgården
	Harry Bild	1962	IFK Norrköping, Zürich, Feyenoord, Öster
	Lennart Wing	1962	Örgryte, Dundee United
	Owe Ohlsson	1962	IFK Göteborg
	Prawitz Öberg	1962	Malmö FF
	Örjan Martinsson	1962	IFK Norrköping
	Hans Mild	1963	Djurgården
	Örjan Persson	1963	Örgryte, Dundee United, Rangers
	Hans Rosander	1964	IFK Norrköping
	Bengt Lindskog	1965	Malmö FF, IFK Malmö
	Ingvar Svahn	1965	Malmö FF
	Jan Karlsson	1965	Djurgården, Ifö Bromölla, Jönköpings Södra
	Björn Nordqvist	1966	IFK Norrköping, PSV, IFK Göteborg
	Leif Eriksson	1966	Djurgården, Sirius, Örebro SK, Nice
	Kurt Axelsson	1967	GAIS, Club Brugge
	Rolf Björklund	1967	Malmö FF
	Ronney Pettersson	1967	Djurgården
	Tom Turesson	1967	Hammarby, Club Brugge
	Bo Larsson	1968	Malmö FF, VfB Stuttgart
	Hans Selander	1968	Hälsingborg, Upsala, Sirius, Halmstad
	Ove Kindvall	1968	IFK Norrköping, Feyenoord
	Inge Ejderstedt	1969	Öster, Anderlecht
	Jan Olsson	1969	GAIS, VfB Stuttgart
	Krister Kristensson	1969	Malmö FF
	Ove Grahn	1969	Elfsborg, Grasshopper, Lausanne-Sport, Örgryte
	Roger Magnusson	1969	Åtvidaberg, Juventus, Marseille
	Roland Grip	1969	AIK, Sirius
	Sven Lindman	1969	Djurgården, Rapid Wien
	Sven-Gunnar Larsson	1969	Örebro SK
	Tommy Svensson	1969	Öster, Standard Liège
	Inge Danielsson	1970	Ifö Bromölla, Hälsingborg
	Ronnie Hellström	1970	Hammarby, Kaiserslautern
	Ove Eklund	1971	Åtvidaberg, Antwerp
	Sten Pålsson	1971	GAIS
	Claes Cronqvist	1972	Djurgården, Landskrona
	Christer Hult	1973	IFK Norrköping
	Conny Torstensson	1973	Åtvidaberg, Bayern Munich, Zürich
	Ralf Edström	1973	Åtvidaberg, PSV, IFK Göteborg, Standard Liège
	Roland Sandberg	1973	Kalmar, Åtvidaberg, Kaiserslautern
	Staffan Tapper	1973	Malmö FF
	Björn Andersson	1974	Öster, Bayern Munich
	Jan Olsson	1974	Åtvidaberg
	Kent Karlsson	1974	Åtvidaberg, IFK Eskilstuna
	Jörgen Augustsson	1975	Åtvidaberg, Landskrona
	Thomas Nordahl	1975	Örebro SK, Anderlecht
	Anders Linderoth	1976	Öster, Marseille, Mjällby
	Jan Mattsson	1976	Öster, Fortuna Düsseldorf
	Thomas Sjöberg	1976	Malmö FF, Karlsruher SC
	Eine Fredriksson	1977	GAIS, IFK Norrköping
	Göran Hagberg	1977	Öster
	Roland Andersson	1977	Malmö FF, Djurgården
	Benny Wendt	1978	IFK Norrköping, Kaiserslautern
	Hasse Borg	1978	Örebro SK, Eintracht Braunschweig, Malmö FF
	Lennart Larsson	1978	Halmstad, Schalke 04
	Olle Nordin	1978	IFK Norrköping, IFK Göteborg, IFK Sundsvall
	Roy Andersson	1978	Malmö FF
	Anders Grönhagen	1979	GIF Sundsvall, Djurgården
	Torbjörn Nilsson	1979	IFK Göteborg
	Bo Börjesson	1980	IFK Sundsvall
	Håkan Arvidsson	1980	Öster
	Ingemar Erlandsson	1980	Malmö FF
	Mats Nordgren	1980	Öster
	Peter Nilsson	1980	Öster, Club Brugge, Kalmar
	Andreas Ravelli	1981	Öster, IFK Göteborg
	Stig Fredriksson	1981	Västerås SK, IFK Göteborg
	Tord Holmgren	1981	IFK Göteborg
	Glenn Hysén	1983	IFK Göteborg, PSV, Fiorentina, Liverpool
	Klas Johansson	1983	Hammarby
	Sten-Ove Ramberg	1983	Hammarby
	Sven Dahlkvist	1983	AIK
	Thomas Ravelli	1983	Öster, IFK Göteborg
	Thomas Wernerson	1983	Åtvidaberg, IFK Göteborg
	Tommy Holmgren	1983	IFK Göteborg
	Robert Prytz	1984	Malmö FF, Rangers, Young Boys, Bayer Uerdingen, Atalanta
	Ulf Eriksson	1984	Hammarby, Aris
	Dan Corneliusson	1985	IFK Göteborg, VfB Stuttgart, Como, Malmö FF
	Glenn Strömberg	1985	IFK Göteborg, Benfica, Atalanta
	Jan Svensson	1985	IFK Norrköping, Eintracht Frankfurt
	Anders Palmér	1987	Malmö FF
	Hans Holmqvist	1987	Hammarby, Fortuna Düsseldorf, Young Boys, Cesena
	Jan Möller	1987	Malmö FF
	Peter Larsson	1987	Halmstad, IFK Göteborg, Ajax, AIK
	Anders Limpar	1988	Örgryte, Young Boys, Cremonese, Arsenal, Everton
	Johnny Ekström	1988	IFK Göteborg, Empoli, Bayern Munich, Cannes, Reggiana, Eintracht Frankfurt
	Jonas Thern	1988	Malmö FF, Zürich, Benfica, Napoli, Roma, Rangers
	Leif Engqvist	1988	Malmö FF
	Michael Andersson	1988	Hammarby, IFK Göteborg
	Roland Nilsson	1988	IFK Göteborg, Sheffield Wednesday, Helsingborg, Coventry City
	Benno Magnusson	1989	Åtvidaberg, Hertha BSC, Kalmar
	Jan Hellström	1989	IFK Norrköping
	Joakim Nilsson	1989	Malmö FF, Sporting Gijón
	Mats Magnusson	1989	Malmö FF, Servette, Benfica
	Peter Lönn	1989	IFK Norrköping
	Roger Ljung	1989	Malmö FF, Young Boys, Zürich, Admira Wacker, Galatasaray, MSV Duisburg
	Stefan Pettersson	1990	IFK Norrköping, IFK Göteborg, Ajax
	Klas Ingesson	1991	IFK Göteborg, Mechelen, PSV, Sheffield Wednesday, Bari
	Stefan Rehn	1991	Djurgården, IFK Göteborg
	Håkan Mild	1992	IFK Göteborg, Servette, Real Sociedad
	Jan Eriksson	1992	AIK, IFK Norrköping, Kaiserslautern
	Joachim Björklund	1992	Brann, IFK Göteborg, Vicenza, Rangers, Valencia
	Martin Dahlin	1992	Malmö FF, Borussia Mönchengladbach, Roma, Blackburn Rovers
	Mats Gren	1992	IFK Göteborg, Grasshopper
	Patrik Andersson	1992	Malmö FF, Blackburn Rovers, Borussia Mönchengladbach, Bayern Munich, Barcelona
	Stefan Schwarz	1992	Malmö FF, Benfica, Arsenal, Fiorentina, Valencia, Sunderland
	Tomas Brolin	1992	IFK Norrköping, Parma, Leeds United
	Lars Eriksson	1993	Hammarby, IFK Norrköping
	Stefan Landberg	1993	Öster, IFK Göteborg
	Henrik Larsson	1994	Helsingborg, Feyenoord, Celtic, Barcelona
	Kennet Andersson	1994	IFK Göteborg, Mechelen, Lille, Caen, Bari, Bologna, Lazio, Fenerbahçe
	Magnus Erlingmark	1994	Örebro SK, IFK Göteborg
	Pontus Kåmark	1994	IFK Göteborg, Leicester City, AIK
	Mikael Nilsson	1995	IFK Göteborg
	Niclas Alexandersson	1995	Halmstad, IFK Göteborg, Sheffield Wednesday, Everton
	Pär Zetterberg	1995	Anderlecht
	Andreas Andersson	1997	IFK Göteborg, Milan, Newcastle United, AIK
	Gary Sundgren	1997	AIK, Real Zaragoza
	Jesper Blomqvist	1997	IFK Göteborg, Milan, Parma, Manchester United, Everton
	Teddy Lucic	1998	Västra Frölunda, IFK Göteborg, Bologna, AIK, Leeds United, Bayer Leverkusen, Häcken
	Johan Mjällby	1999	AIK, Celtic, Levante
	Jörgen Pettersson	1999	Malmö FF, Borussia Mönchengladbach, Kaiserslautern, Copenhagen
	Magnus Hedman	1999	AIK, Coventry City, Celtic, Ancona
	Daniel Andersson	2000	Malmö FF, Bari, Venezia
	Freddie Ljungberg	2000	Halmstad, Arsenal, West Ham United
	Anders Svensson	2001	Elfsborg, Southampton
	Magnus Svensson	2001	Halmstad, Viking, Brøndby
	Mattias Jonson	2001	Helsingborg, Brøndby, Norwich City, Djurgården
	Olof Mellberg	2001	Racing Santander, Aston Villa, Juventus, Olympiacos
	Marcus Allbäck	2002	Örgryte, Heerenveen, Aston Villa, Hansa Rostock, Copenhagen
	Tobias Linderoth	2002	Stabæk, Everton, Copenhagen, Galatasaray
	Andreas Jakobsson	2003	Helsingborg, Hansa Rostock, Brøndby
	Anders Andersson	2004	Malmö FF, Blackburn Rovers, AaB, Benfica, Belenenses
	Andreas Isaksson	2004	Djurgården, Rennes, Manchester City, PSV, Kasımpaşa
	Mikael Nilsson	2004	Halmstad, Southampton, Panathinaikos, Brøndby
	Zlatan Ibrahimovic	2004	Malmö FF, Ajax, Juventus, Inter Milan, Barcelona, Milan, Paris Saint-Germain
	Christian Wilhelmsson	2005	Stabæk, Anderlecht, Nantes, Deportivo La Coruña, Al Hilal, Al Ahli, LA Galaxy
	Erik Edman	2005	AIK, Heerenveen, Tottenham Hotspur, Rennes, Wigan Athletic
	Kim Källström	2005	Häcken, Djurgården, Rennes, Lyon, Spartak Moscow, Arsenal, Grasshopper
	Johan Elmander	2007	Feyenoord, Djurgården, NAC Breda, Brøndby, Toulouse, Bolton Wanderers, Galatasaray, Norwich City
	Petter Hansson	2007	Halmstad, Heerenveen, Rennes
	Daniel Majstorovic	2009	Malmö FF, Twente, Basel, AEK, Celtic, AIK
	Sebastian Larsson	2011	Birmingham City, Sunderland, Hull City, AIK
	Mikael Lustig	2012	GIF Sundsvall, Rosenborg, Celtic, AIK
	Ola Toivonen	2012	Örgryte, PSV, Sunderland, Toulouse
	Pontus Wernbloom	2012	IFK Göteborg, AZ, CSKA Moscow
	Rasmus Elm	2012	Kalmar, AZ, CSKA Moscow
	Martin Olsson	2013	Blackburn Rovers, Norwich City, Swansea City, Helsingborg, Malmö FF
	Andreas Granqvist	2014	Helsingborg, Wigan Athletic, Groningen, Genoa, Krasnodar
	Marcus Berg	2015	Groningen, Hamburger SV, PSV, Panathinaikos, Al Ain, Krasnodar
	Mikael Antonsson	2015	IFK Göteborg, Panathinaikos, Copenhagen, Bologna
	Albin Ekdal	2016	Juventus, Cagliari, Hamburger SV, Sampdoria, Spezia
	Emil Forsberg	2016	Malmö FF, RB Leipzig, New York Red Bulls
	Jimmy Durmaz	2016	Malmö FF, Gençlerbirliği, Olympiacos, Toulouse, Galatasaray
	Ludwig Augustinsson	2018	Copenhagen, Werder Bremen, Sevilla, Aston Villa, Anderlecht
	Viktor Claesson	2018	IFK Värnamo, Elfsborg, Krasnodar, Copenhagen
	John Guidetti	2018	Feyenoord, Celtic, Celta Vigo, Alavés
	Isaac Kiese Thelin	2018	Malmö FF, Bordeaux, Anderlecht, Waasland-Beveren, Bayer Leverkusen
	Victor Lindelöf	2018	Benfica, Manchester United
	Robin Olsen	2018	Malmö FF, Copenhagen, Roma, Everton, Sheffield United, Aston Villa
	Gustav Svensson	2018	IFK Göteborg, Seattle Sounders, Guangzhou R&F
	Pierre Bengtsson	2019	Nordsjælland, Copenhagen, Mainz 05, Vejle, Djurgården
	Kristoffer Olsson	2020	Midtjylland, AIK, Krasnodar, Anderlecht
	Alexander Isak	2021	AIK, Willem II, Real Sociedad, Newcastle United
	Emil Krafth	2021	Helsingborg, Bologna, Amiens, Newcastle United
	Robin Quaison	2021	AIK, Palermo, Mainz 05, Al-Ettifaq
	Marcus Danielson	2022	Djurgården, Dalian Yifang
	Filip Helander	2022	Bologna, Rangers, OB
	Dejan Kulusevski	2022	Parma, Juventus, Tottenham Hotspur
	Mattias Svanberg	2022	Bologna, VfL Wolfsburg
	Jens Cajuste	2024	Midtjylland, Reims, Napoli, Ipswich Town
	Viktor Gyökeres	2024	Brighton & Hove Albion, Coventry City, Sporting CP

=== Women ===
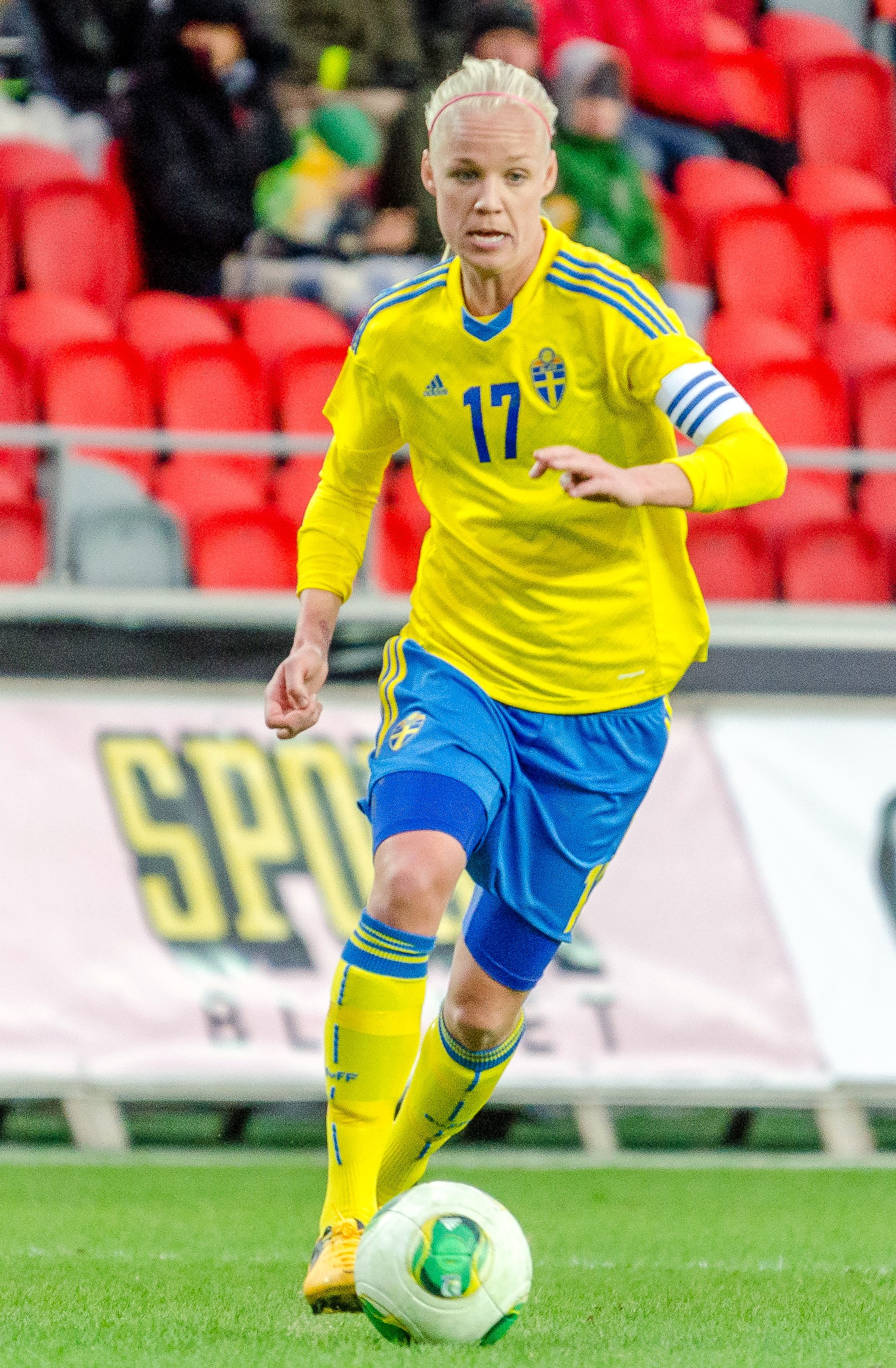
Caroline Seger was awarded Stor tjej in 2007.

As of 17 January 2025

No	Player	Year	Club(s)
	Anette Börjesson	1977	GAIS, Jitex
	Lena Isberg	1977	Hammarby, Jitex
	Ann Jansson	1977	Hammarby
	Ann-Kristin Lindkvist	1977	Öxabäck
	Pia Sundhage	1977	SGU Falköping, Falköpings KIK, Jitex, Öster, Lazio, Hammarby
	Mona Åhman	1978	Öxabäck
	Karin Åhman-Svensson	1978	Öxabäck, Kronäng, Nässjö
	Susanne Erlandsson	1979	IFK Hallsberg, Halmia
	Elisabeth Leidinge	1979	Jitex, GIF Sundsvall, Malmö FF
	Birgit Nilsson	1979	Skabersjö
	Karin Ödlund	1979	Alnö, Kronäng
	Görel Sintorn	1979	Sunnanå, Jitex
	Birgitta Söderström	1979	Sunnanå, Jakobsberg, IK Göta
	Anna-Karin Andersson	1980	Gideonsberg
	Ulla Håkansson	1980	Skabersjö
	Anna Svenjeby	1980	Kronäng, Jitex
	Anette Nicklasson	1981	Jitex
	Eva Andersson	1983	Öxabäck, Sundsvalls DFF
	Angelica Burevik	1983	Stattena
	Helen Johansson	1984	Jitex/JG 93, Öxabäck, GAIS, Ahlafors
	Maria Kåberg	1984	AIK
	Doris Uusitalo	1985	Öxabäck, Hammarby
	Gunilla Axén	1986	Gideonsberg
	Lena Videkull	1986	Malmö FF, Öxabäck, Kronäng, Trollhättans IF
	Anneli Andelén	1988	Öxabäck/Mark
	Camilla Andersson	1988	Malmö FF, Sunnanå
	Anette Hansson	1988	Jitex, Öxabäck, Malmö FF
	Ingrid Johansson	1988	Jitex, GAIS
	Marie Karlsson	1988	Öxabäck
	Eleonor Hultin	1989	GAIS, Jitex
	Malin Swedberg	1990	Djurgården, Älvjsö, Sundbyberg
	Eva Zeikfalvy	1990	Malmö FF, Tyresö
	Marie Ewrelius	1991	Djurgården
	Susanne Hedberg	1991	Gideonsberg, Sunnanå
	Malin Lundgren	1991	Malmö FF
	Pia Syrén	1991	Öxabäck
	Helen Nilsson	1992	Gideonsberg, Sundsvalls DFF
	Pärnilla Larsson	1993	Gideonsberg
	Kristin Bengtsson	1994	Öxabäck/Mark, Hammarby, Athene Moss, Kopparbergs/Landvetter, San Diego Spirit, Carolina Courage, Malmö FF, Djurgården/Älvsjö
	Åsa Jakobsson	1994	Gideonsberg
	Ulrika Kalte	1994	Hammarby, Älvjsö
	Malin Andersson	1995	Älvjsö, Malmö FF
	Åsa Lönnqvist	1995	Tyresö, Älvjsö
	Annika Nessvold	1995	Malmö FF
	Annelie Nilsson	1996	Sunnanå
	Anna Pohjanen	1996	Sunnanå, Älvjsö
	Cecilia Sandell	1996	Lindsdal, Älvjsö
	Camilla Svensson	1996	Öxabäck/Mark, Jitex/JG 93
	Ulrika Karlsson	1997	Bälinge, San Diego Spirit
	Hanna Ljungberg	1997	Sunnanå, Umeå IK
	Jane Törnqvist	1997	Tyresö, Hammarby, Älvjsö, Djurgården/Älvsjö
	Malin Allberg	1998	Älvjsö, Hammarby
	Christin Lilja	1998	Lotorp, Athene Moss
	Victoria Sandell Svensson	1998	Nittorp, Jitex/JG 93, Älvjsö, Djurgården/Älvsjö
	Karolina Westberg	1998	Malmö FF, Umeå IK
	Linda Fagerström	1999	Bälinge, Hammarby, Älvjsö, Djurgården/Älvsjö
	Hanna Marklund	2000	Sunnanå, Umeå IK
	Malin Moström	2000	Umeå IK
	Tina Nordlund	2000	Umeå IK
	Sara Call	2001	Bälinge
	Elin Flyborg	2001	Djurgården, Djurgården/Älvsjö
	Caroline Jönsson	2001	Malmö FF/LdB Malmö
	Sara Larsson	2001	Malmö FF, Linköping, St. Louis Athletica, Philadelphia Independence, Kif Örebro
	Therese Lundin	2001	Malmö FF
	Salina Olsson	2001	Djurgården, Hammarby, Kopparbergs/Göteborg
	Therese Sjögran	2001	Kristianstad/Wä, Malmö FF, LdB Malmö, Rosengård
	Anna Sjöström	2003	Umeå IK
	Frida Östberg	2004	Umeå IK, Linköping
	Josefine Öqvist	2005	Bälinge, Linköping, Tyresö, Kristianstad, Montpellier
	Sara Johansson	2006	Kristianstad/Wä, Djurgården, Djurgården/Älvsjö, Hammarby
	Lotta Schelin	2006	Kopparbergs/Göteborg, Lyon, Rosengård
	Caroline Seger	2007	Stattena, Linköping, Philadelphia Independence, Western New York Flash, LdB Malmö, Tyresö, Paris Saint-Germain, Lyon, Rosengård
	Nilla Fischer	2008	Kristianstad/Wä, Malmö FF/LdB Malmö, Linköping, VfL Wolfsburg
	Jessica Landström	2008	Hammarby, Linköping, Sky Blue, Frankfurt, Djurgården
	Hedvig Lindahl	2008	Linköping, Kopparbergs/Göteborg, Kristianstad, Chelsea, VfL Wolfsburg, Atlético Madrid, Djurgården
	Anna Paulson	2008	Umeå IK
	Stina Segerström	2008	Kif Örebro, Kopparbergs/Göteborg
	Sara Thunebro	2008	Djurgården/Älvsjö, Frankfurt, Tyresö, Eskilstuna United
	Kosovare Asllani	2010	Linköping, Chicago Red Stars, Kristianstad, Paris Saint-Germain, Manchester City, CD Tacón/Real Madrid, Milan, London City Lionesses
	Lisa Dahlkvist	2010	Umeå IK, Kopparbergs/Göteborg, Tyresö, Avaldsnes, Kif Örebro, Paris Saint-Germain
	Linda Forsberg	2010	Djurgården, LdB Malmö
	Charlotte Rohlin	2010	Linköping
	Lina Nilsson	2011	LdB Malmö, Rosengård
	Marie Hammarström	2013	Kif Örebro, Kopparbergs/Göteborg
	Sofia Jakobsson	2013	Umeå IK, Rossiyanka, Chelsea, BV Cloppenburg, Montpellier, CD Tacón/Real Madrid, San Diego Wave, Bayern Munich, London City Lionesses
	Antonia Göransson	2014	Hamburger SV, Turbine Potsdam, Vittsjö
	Linda Sembrant	2014	AIK, Kopparbergs/Göteborg, Tyresö, Montpellier, Juventus
	Olivia Schough	2015	Kopparbergs/Göteborg, Bayern Munich, Rossiyanka, Eskilstuna United, Djurgården, Rosengård
	Jessica Wik	2015	Linköping, Arsenal, Rosengård
	Emma Berglund	2016	Umeå IK, Rosengård, Paris Saint-Germain
	Magdalena Eriksson	2016	Linköping, Chelsea, Bayern Munich
	Elin Rubensson	2016	LdB Malmö, Rosengård, Kopparbergs/Göteborg, Häcken
	Stina Blackstenius	2017	Linköping, Montpellier, Kopparbergs/Göteborg, Häcken, Arsenal
	Fridolina Rolfö	2017	Linköping, Bayern Munich, VfL Wolfsburg, Barcelona
	Jonna Andersson	2018	Linköping, Chelsea, Hammarby
	Hanna Folkesson	2018	Rosengård, Djurgården
	Hanna Glas	2019	Eskilstuna United, Paris Saint-Germain, Bayern Munich
	Lina Hurtig	2019	Umeå IK, Linköping, Juventus, Arsenal
	Anna Anvegård	2020	Växjö, Rosengård, Everton, Häcken
	Amanda Ilestedt	2020	LdB Malmö, Rosengård, Turbine Potsdam, Bayern Munich, Paris Saint-Germain
	Filippa Angeldahl	2021	Linköping, Kopparbergs/Göteborg, Häcken, Manchester City
	Hanna Bennison	2021	Rosengård, Everton
	Nathalie Björn	2021	Eskilstuna United, Rosengård, Everton
	Madelen Janogy	2021	Piteå, Hammarby, Fiorentina
	Rebecka Blomqvist	2023	Kopparbergs/Göteborg, VfL Wolfsburg
	Jennifer Falk	2023	Kopparbergs/Göteborg, Häcken
	Johanna Rytting Kaneryd	2023	Häcken, Chelsea
	Pauline Hammarlund	2024	Piteå, Kopparbergs/Göteborg, Häcken, Fiorentina
	Zećira Mušović	2024	Rosengård, Chelsea
	Julia Zigiotti Olme	2024	Kopparbergs/Göteborg, Häcken, Brighton & Hove Albion

== See also ==
- List of athletes awarded Stora grabbars och tjejers märke
- List of bandy players awarded Stora Grabbars och Tjejers Märke
- List of ice hockey players awarded Stora Grabbars och Tjejers Märke
- List of skiers awarded Stora grabbars och tjejers märke
