= 1922–23 in Swedish football =

The 1922-23 season in Swedish football, starting March 1922 and ending July 1923:

== Honours ==
=== Official titles ===
Title	Team	Reason
1922 Swedish Champions	GAIS	Winners of Svenska Mästerskapet

=== Competitions ===
Level	Competition	Team
1st level	Division 1 Svenska Serien Östra 1922–23	AIK
1st level	Division 1 Svenska Serien Västra 1922–23	GAIS
1st level	Division 1 Svenska Serien play-off 1922–23	GAIS
2nd level	Division 2 Uppsvenska Serien 1922–23	Stockholms BK
2nd level	Division 2 Mellansvenska Serien 1922	Västerås IK
2nd level	Division 2 Västsvenska Serien 1922–23	Fässbergs IF
Championship Cup	Svenska Mästerskapet 1922	GAIS
Cup competition	Kamratmästerskapen 1922	IFK Göteborg

== Promotions, relegations and qualifications ==
=== Promotions ===
Promoted from	Promoted to	Team	Reason
Unknown	Division 1 Svenska Serien 1923–24	Landskrona BoIS	Winners of qualification play-off
Unknown	Division 2 Uppsvenska Serien 1923–24	Avesta IF	Unknown
Unknown	Division 2 Uppsvenska Serien 1923–24	Brynäs IF	Unknown
Unknown	Division 2 Uppsvenska Serien 1923–24	Domnarvets GIF	Unknown
Unknown	Division 2 Uppsvenska Serien 1923–24	Falu IK	Unknown
Unknown	Division 2 Uppsvenska Serien 1923–24	Gefle IF	Unknown
Unknown	Division 2 Uppsvenska Serien 1923–24	Grycksbo IF	Unknown
Unknown	Division 2 Uppsvenska Serien 1923–24	Sandvikens AIK	Unknown
Unknown	Division 2 Uppsvenska Serien 1923–24	Skutskärs IF	Unknown

=== League transfers ===
Transferred from	Transferred to	Team	Reason
Division 2 Uppsvenska Serien 1922–23	Division 2 Östsvenska Serien 1923–24	IF Linnéa	League name change
Division 2 Uppsvenska Serien 1922–23	Division 2 Östsvenska Serien 1923–24	Mariebergs IK	League name change
Division 2 Uppsvenska Serien 1922–23	Division 2 Östsvenska Serien 1923–24	IK Sirius	League name change
Division 2 Uppsvenska Serien 1922–23	Division 2 Östsvenska Serien 1923–24	Stockholms BK	League name change
Division 2 Uppsvenska Serien 1922–23	Division 2 Östsvenska Serien 1923–24	IFK Stockholm	League name change
Division 2 Uppsvenska Serien 1922–23	Division 2 Östsvenska Serien 1923–24	Westermalms IF	League name change
Division 2 Uppsvenska Serien 1922–23	Division 2 Östsvenska Serien 1923–24	Östermalms IF	League name change

=== Relegations ===
Relegated from	Relegated to	Team	Reason
Division 1 Svenska Serien 1922–23	Division 2 Sydsvenska Serien 1923–24	Malmö FF	Losers of qualification play-off
Division 2 Uppsvenska Serien 1922–23	Unknown	Järva IS	Unknown

== Domestic results ==
=== Division 1 Svenska Serien Östra 1922–23 ===

	Team	Pld	W	D	L	GF		GA	GD	Pts
1	AIK	10	7	1	2	28	–	17	+11	15
2	IFK Eskilstuna	10	4	2	4	21	–	17	+4	10
3	Hammarby IF	10	4	1	5	16	–	18	-2	9
4	Djurgårdens IF	10	3	3	4	16	–	19	-3	9
5	IK Sleipner	10	4	1	5	14	–	20	-6	9
6	IFK Norrköping	10	4	0	6	15	–	19	-4	8

=== Division 1 Svenska Serien Västra 1922–23 ===
	Team	Pld	W	D	L	GF		GA	GD	Pts
1	GAIS	10	5	3	2	15	–	10	+5	13
2	IFK Göteborg	10	5	2	3	18	–	9	+9	12
3	Örgryte IS	10	5	2	3	17	–	9	+8	12
4	Helsingborgs IF	10	4	4	2	14	–	9	+5	12
5	IFK Malmö	10	3	1	6	8	–	22	-14	7
6	Malmö FF	10	1	2	7	6	–	19	-13	4

=== Division 1 Svenska Serien play-off 1922–23 ===
June 17, 1923

GAIS	3–1	AIK

?, Gothenburg
July 8, 1923

AIK	0–2	GAIS

?, Stockholm

=== Division 1 Svenska Serien qualification play-off 1922–23 ===
May 27, 1923

Västerås IK	1–2	IFK Norrköping

?, Västerås
June 10, 1923

IFK Norrköping	4–1	Västerås IK

?, Norrköping

May 27, 1923

Malmö FF	1–1	Landskrona BoIS

?, Malmö
May 31, 1923

Landskrona BoIS	2–0	Malmö FF

?, Landskrona

=== Division 2 Uppsvenska Serien 1922–23 ===

	Team	Pld	W	D	L	GF		GA	GD	Pts
1	Stockholms BK	14	10	2	2	42	–	17	+25	22
2	Westermalms IF	14	9	2	3	31	–	14	+17	20
3	IFK Stockholm	14	8	3	3	31	–	21	+10	19
4	IK Sirius	14	6	2	6	25	–	25	0	14
5	IF Linnéa	14	4	4	6	22	–	26	-4	12
6	Östermalms IF	14	5	1	8	24	–	33	-9	11
7	Mariebergs IK	14	2	5	7	14	–	26	-12	9
8	Järva IS	14	2	1	11	12	–	39	-27	5

=== Division 2 Mellansvenska Serien 1922 ===
	Team	Pld	W	D	L	GF		GA	GD	Pts
1	Västerås IK	12	11	0	1	35	–	11	+24	22
2	Örebro SK	12	9	0	3	32	–	21	+11	18
3	Katrineholms AIK	12	5	2	5	23	–	21	+2	12
4	IK City	12	5	1	6	28	–	25	+3	11
5	Köpings IS	12	5	0	7	15	–	24	-9	10
6	IFK Arboga	12	2	2	8	21	–	30	-9	6
7	IFK Västerås	12	2	1	9	12	–	34	-22	5

=== Division 2 Västsvenska Serien 1922–23 ===
	Team	Pld	W	D	L	GF		GA	GD	Pts
1	Fässbergs IF	14	11	1	2	32	–	13	+19	23
2	IK Virgo	14	9	0	5	29	–	21	+8	18
3	IFK Uddevalla	14	8	1	5	30	–	20	+10	17
4	IF Elfsborg	14	5	2	7	27	–	24	+3	12
5	Vänersborgs IF	14	4	4	6	21	–	30	-9	12
6	Skara IF	14	5	2	7	16	–	25	-9	12
7	IFK Vänersborg	14	4	2	8	14	–	28	-14	10
8	IF Heimer	14	3	2	9	29	–	37	-8	8

=== Svenska Mästerskapet 1922 ===
Final

October 8, 1922

GAIS	3–1	Hammarby IF

Stockholms Stadion, Stockholm

=== Kamratmästerskapen 1922 ===
Final

May 29, 1924

IFK Göteborg	7–0	IFK Stockholm

Slottsskogsvallen, Gothenburg

== National team results ==
May 28, 1922
Friendly
№ 74

Sweden	1–2	Poland
Svedberg 56'		Klotz 27' (p); Garbień 74'

Stockholms Stadion, Stockholm
Attendance: 16,142
Referee: Meisl (Austria)

Sweden: Frithiof Rudén - Valdus Lund, Einar Hemming - Gunnar Eriksson, Helge Andersson, Harry Sundberg - Rune Bergström, Helmer Svedberg, Per Kaufeldt, Helge Ekroth, Rudolf Kock.

June 5, 1922
Friendly
№ 75

Finland	1–4	Sweden
Katajavuori 15'		Edlund 5', 47'; Kaufeldt 10', 73'

Tölö bollplan, Helsinki
Attendance: 5,000
Referee: Meisl (Austria)

Sweden: Frithiof Rudén - Valdus Lund, Einar Hemming - Justus Gustafsson, Gunnar Holmberg, Nils Karlsson ( Helmer Svedberg) - Rune Bergström ( Herbert Ohlsson), Helmer Edlund, Per Kaufeldt, Helge Ekroth, Rudolf Kock.

July 9, 1922
Friendly
№ 76

Sweden	1–1	Hungary
Börjesson 43'		Hirzer 76'

Stockholms Stadion, Stockholm
Attendance: 15,752
Referee: Andersen (Denmark)

Sweden: Sigfrid Lindberg - Valdus Lund, Henning Svensson - Ivar Klingström, Sven Friberg, Helge Ekroth - Rune Bergström, Herbert Karlsson, Erik Börjesson, Erik Hjelm, Rudolf Kock.

August 13, 1922
Friendly
№ 77

Sweden	0–2	Czechoslovakia
		Sloup-Štapl 29'; Dvořáček 37'

Stockholms Stadion, Stockholm
Attendance: 17,000
Referee: Hansen (Denmark)

Sweden: Sigfrid Lindberg - Valdus Lund, Henning Svensson - Erik Levin, Sven Friberg, Ivar Klingström - Rune Wenzel, Albert Olsson, Herbert Karlsson, Albin Dahl, Rudolf Kock.

August 23, 1922
Friendly
№ 78

Sweden	0–0	Norway

Stockholms Stadion, Stockholm
Attendance: 14,000
Referee: Ulrich (Denmark)

Sweden: Sigfrid Lindberg - Valdus Lund, Erik Lillienberg - Erik Levin, Sven Friberg, Ivar Klingström - Rune Bergström, Harry Dahl, Herbert Karlsson, Albin Dahl, Rudolf Kock.

September 24, 1922
Friendly
№ 79

Norway	0–5	Sweden
		Malm 4', 25'; A. Dahl 30', 40', 75'

Gressbanen, Kristiania
Attendance: 15,000
Referee: Andersen (Denmark)

Sweden: Sigfrid Lindberg - Valdus Lund, Henning Svensson - Hjalmar Andersson, Sven Friberg, Ivar Klingström - Rune Wenzel, Harry Dahl, Otto Malm, Albin Dahl, Rudolf Kock.

October 1, 1922
Friendly
№ 80

Denmark	1–2	Sweden
Nielsen 34'		H. Dahl 25'; A. Dahl 58'

Idrætsparken, Copenhagen
Attendance: 23,000
Referee: Eymers (Netherlands)

Sweden: Sigfrid Lindberg - Valdus Lund ( Fritjof Hillén), Henning Svensson - Hjalmar Andersson, Sven Friberg, Ivar Klingström - Rune Wenzel, Harry Dahl, Otto Malm, Albin Dahl, Rudolf Kock.

May 21, 1923
Friendly
№ 81

Sweden	2–4	England
Dahl 33', 83'		Walker 22', 75'; Thornewell 25'; Moore 40'

Stockholms Stadion, Stockholm
Attendance: 14,500
Referee: Meisl (Austria)

Sweden: Sigfrid Lindberg - Valdus Lund, Henning Svensson - Hjalmar Andersson, Sven Friberg, Ivar Klingström - Gunnar Olsson, Harry Dahl, Otto Malm, Erik Hjelm, Rudolf Kock.

June 10, 1923
Friendly
№ 82

Sweden	4–2	Austria
H. Dahl 39'; Olsson 43'; A. Dahl 73', 88'		Swatosch 40'; Wieser 52'

Slottsskogsvallen, Gothenburg
Attendance: 9,500
Referee: Herites (Czechoslovakia)

Sweden: Sigfrid Lindberg - Valdus Lund, Henning Svensson - Ivar Klingström, Sven Friberg, Erik Andersson - Rune Wenzel, Harry Dahl, Gunnar Olsson, Albin Dahl, Rudolf Kock.

June 20, 1923
Friendly
№ 83

Sweden	5–4	Finland
Rydell 1'; Paulsson 31', 48', 64'; Carlsson 37'		Kelin 4'; Linna 20', 54'; Eklöf 66'

Strömvallen, Gävle
Attendance: 4,055
Referee: Bauwens (Germany)

Sweden: Robert Zander - Gösta Wihlborg, Oskar Forsberg - Sven Lindqvist, Gunnar Holmberg, Gösta Pettersson-Pejne - Thure Sterne, Sven Rydell, Bror Carlsson, Gunnar Paulsson, Olle Ringdahl.

June 29, 1923
Friendly
№ 84

Sweden	2–1	Germany
H. Dahl 47'; A. Dahl 64'		Seiderer 38'

Stockholms Stadion, Stockholm
Attendance: 16,000
Referee: Smedvik (Norway)

Sweden: Sigfrid Lindberg - Valdus Lund, Henning Svensson - Ivar Klingström, Sven Friberg, Erik Andersson - Rune Wenzel, Harry Dahl, Gunnar Olsson, Albin Dahl, Rudolf Kock.

== National team players in season 1922/23 ==
name	pos.	caps	goals	club
Erik "Mickel" Andersson	MF	2	0	IFK Göteborg
Helge "Snopparn" Andersson	MF	1	0	Hammarby IF
Hjalmar "Julle" Andersson	MF	3	0	Hälsingborgs IF
Rune Bergström	FW	4	0	AIK
Erik "Börje" Börjesson	FW	1	1	Jonsereds IF
Bror "Brollan" Carlsson	FW	1	1	GAIS
Albin Dahl	FW	6	7	Hälsingborgs IF
Harry "Hacke" Dahl	FW	6	5	Hälsingborgs IF (3); Landskrona BoIS (3)
Helmer "Valdus" Edlund	FW	1	2	IK Sleipner
Helge "Ekis" Ekroth	FW	3	0	AIK
Gunnar Eriksson	MF	1	0	AIK
Oskar Forsberg	DF	1	0	Sandvikens AIK
Sven Friberg	MF	8	0	Örgryte IS
Justus "Negern" Gustafsson	DF/MF	1	0	AIK
Einar "Hacko" Hemming	DF	2	0	Djurgårdens IF
Fritjof "Fritte" Hillén	DF	1	0	GAIS
Erik Hjelm	FW	2	0	IFK Göteborg
Gunnar "Bajadären" Holmberg	MF	2	0	GAIS
Herbert "Murren" Karlsson	FW	3	0	IFK Göteborg
Nils Karlsson	MF	1	0	GAIS
Per "Pära" Kaufeldt	FW	2	2	AIK
Ivar "Klinga" Klingström	MF	8	0	Örgryte IS
Rudolf "Putte" Kock	FW	10	0	AIK
Erik "Bagarn" Levin	MF	2	0	IFK Göteborg
Erik "Flintis" Lillienberg	DF	1	0	Örgryte IS
Sigfrid "Sigge" Lindberg	GK	8	0	Hälsingborgs IF
Sven "Linkan" Lindqvist	MF	1	0	AIK
Valdus "Gobben" Lund	DF	10	0	IFK Göteborg
Otto "Petter" Malm	FW	3	2	Hälsingborgs IF
Herbert "Banken" Ohlsson	FW	1	0	AIK
Albert "Abben" Olsson	FW	1	0	GAIS
Gunnar "Lill-Gunnar" Olsson	FW	3	1	Hälsingborgs IF
Gunnar Paulsson	FW	1	3	GAIS
Gösta Pettersson-Pejne	MF	1	0	IFK Eskilstuna
Olle Ringdahl	FW	1	0	IFK Norrköping
Frithiof "Fritte" Rudén	GK	2	0	Djurgårdens IF
Sven "Trollgubben" Rydell	FW	1	1	Örgryte IS
Thure "Turken" Sterne	FW	1	0	IFK Stockholm
Harry Sundberg	MF	1	0	Djurgårdens IF
Helmer "Pysen" Svedberg	FW	2	1	AIK
Henning Svensson	DF	7	0	IFK Göteborg
Rune Wenzel	FW	5	0	GAIS
Gösta "Pysen" Wihlborg	DF	1	0	Hammarby IF
Robert Zander	GK	1	0	Örgryte IS
