= 1924–25 in Swedish football =

The 1924–25 season in Swedish football, starting August 1924 and ending July 1925:

== Honours ==
=== Official titles ===
Title	Team	Reason
1924 Swedish Champions	Fässbergs IF	Winners of Svenska Mästerskapet

=== Competitions ===
Level	Competition	Team
1st level	Allsvenskan 1924–25	GAIS
2nd level	Division 2 Uppsvenska Serien 1924–25	Brynäs IF
2nd level	Division 2 Mellansvenska Serien 1924–25	IK City
2nd level	Division 2 Östsvenska Serien 1924–25	Westermalms IF
2nd level	Division 2 Västsvenska Serien 1924–25	IFK Uddevalla
2nd level	Division 2 Sydsvenska Serien 1924–25	IS Halmia
Championship Cup	Svenska Mästerskapet 1924	Fässbergs IF
Regional Championship	Norrländska Mästerskapet 1925	Strands IF
Cup competition	Kamratmästerskapen 1924	IFK Göteborg

== Promotions, relegations and qualifications ==
=== Promotions ===
Promoted from	Promoted to	Team	Reason
Division 2 Mellansvenska Serien 1924–25	Allsvenskan 1925–26	IK City	Winners of promotion play-off
Division 2 Västsvenska Serien 1924–25	Allsvenskan 1925–26	IFK Uddevalla	Winners of promotion play-off
Unknown	Division 2 Uppsvenska Serien 1925–26	Kvarnsvedens GIF	Unknown
Unknown	Division 2 Mellansvenska Serien 1925–26	Västerås SK	Unknown
Unknown	Division 2 Mellansvenska Serien 1925–26	IFK Örebro	Unknown
Unknown	Division 2 Östsvenska Serien 1925–26	Tranebergs IF	Unknown
Unknown	Division 2 Västsvenska Serien 1925–26	Krokslätts FF	Unknown
Unknown	Division 2 Västsvenska Serien 1925–26	Trollhättans IF	Unknown
Unknown	Division 2 Västsvenska Serien 1925–26	Uddevalla IS	Unknown
Unknown	Division 2 Sydsvenska Serien 1925–26	Stattena IF	Unknown

=== Relegations ===
Relegated from	Relegated to	Team	Reason
Allsvenskan 1924–25	Division 2 Mellansvenska Serien 1925–26	Västerås IK	11th team
Allsvenskan 1924–25	Division 2 Östsvenska Serien 1925–26	Hammarby IF	12th team
Division 2 Uppsvenska Serien 1924–25	Unknown	Avesta IF	8th team
Division 2 Uppsvenska Serien 1924–25	Unknown	Grycksbo IF	Excluded
Division 2 Mellansvenska Serien 1924–25	Unknown	IFK Arboga	9th team
Division 2 Östsvenska Serien 1924–25	Unknown	Södertälje IF	10th team
Division 2 Östsvenska Serien 1924–25	Unknown	IFK Nyköping	11th team
Division 2 Västsvenska Serien 1924–25	Unknown	IFK Vänersborg	8th team
Division 2 Västsvenska Serien 1924–25	Unknown	IK Virgo	9th team

== Domestic results ==
=== Allsvenskan 1924–25 ===

	Team	Pld	W	D	L	GF		GA	GD	Pts
1	GAIS	22	17	4	1	63	–	16	+47	38
2	IFK Göteborg	22	16	4	2	87	–	30	+57	36
3	Örgryte IS	22	15	5	2	67	–	17	+50	35
4	Helsingborgs IF	22	12	4	6	50	–	29	+21	28
5	AIK	22	12	0	10	57	–	38	+19	24
6	Landskrona BoIS	22	7	6	9	30	–	52	-22	20
7	IK Sleipner	22	7	4	11	37	–	49	-12	18
8	IFK Norrköping	22	8	1	13	27	–	49	-22	17
9	IFK Eskilstuna	22	6	4	12	41	–	58	-17	16
10	IFK Malmö	22	5	5	12	39	–	55	-16	15
11	Västerås IK	22	2	5	15	21	–	66	-45	9
12	Hammarby IF	22	2	4	16	23	–	83	-60	8

=== Allsvenskan promotion play-off 1924–25 ===
June 21, 1925

IK City	2–0	Westermalms IF

?, Eskilstuna
June 28, 1925

Westermalms IF	1–2	IK City

?, Stockholm

June 21, 1925

IFK Uddevalla	3–0	IS Halmia

?, Uddevalla
June 28, 1925

IS Halmia	0–0	IFK Uddevalla

?, Halmstad

=== Division 2 Uppsvenska Serien 1924–25 ===

	Team	Pld	W	D	L	GF		GA	GD	Pts
1	Brynäs IF	14	13	1	0	60	–	17	+43	27
2	Gefle IF	14	9	3	2	70	–	25	+45	21
3	Sandvikens IF	14	8	2	4	44	–	30	+14	18
4	Sandvikens AIK	14	5	2	7	37	–	38	-1	12
5	Skutskärs IF	14	5	2	7	27	–	40	-13	12
6	Falu IK	14	5	2	7	23	–	47	-24	12
7	Domnarvets GIF	14	3	3	8	20	–	38	-18	9
8	Avesta IF	14	0	1	13	15	–	61	-46	1
–	Grycksbo IF	16	3	3	10	19	–	38	-19	9

=== Division 2 Mellansvenska Serien 1924–25 ===
	Team	Pld	W	D	L	GF		GA	GD	Pts
1	IK City	16	12	0	4	39	–	19	+20	24
2	Hallstahammars SK	16	9	4	3	43	–	27	+16	22
3	Katrineholms SK	16	10	1	5	34	–	26	+8	21
4	Örebro IK	16	6	3	7	35	–	35	0	15
5	Köpings IS	16	5	5	6	35	–	37	-2	15
6	IFK Västerås	16	5	4	7	19	–	19	0	14
7	Katrineholms AIK	16	6	2	8	35	–	42	-7	14
8	Örebro SK	16	4	5	7	28	–	27	+1	13
9	IFK Arboga	16	3	0	13	17	–	53	-36	6

=== Division 2 Östsvenska Serien 1924–25 ===
	Team	Pld	W	D	L	GF		GA	GD	Pts
1	Westermalms IF	20	16	3	1	75	–	14	+61	35
2	Sundbybergs IK	20	14	4	2	50	–	19	+31	32
3	Djurgårdens IF	20	11	4	5	65	–	18	+47	26
4	Reymersholms IK	20	11	1	8	47	–	29	+18	23
5	IK Sirius	20	9	2	9	47	–	35	+12	20
6	IF Linnéa	20	8	4	8	62	–	51	+11	20
7	Mariebergs IK	20	8	4	8	32	–	32	0	20
8	Stockholms BK	20	8	4	8	31	–	43	-12	20
9	IFK Stockholm	20	6	3	11	32	–	47	-15	15
10	Södertälje IF	20	3	1	16	21	–	89	-68	7
11	IFK Nyköping	20	1	0	19	19	–	104	-85	2

=== Division 2 Västsvenska Serien 1924–25 ===
	Team	Pld	W	D	L	GF		GA	GD	Pts
1	IFK Uddevalla	16	13	1	2	61	–	13	+48	27
2	Jonsereds IF	16	10	2	4	41	–	18	+31	22
3	Fässbergs IF	16	8	3	5	26	–	16	+10	19
4	IF Elfsborg	16	7	4	5	25	–	20	+5	18
5	Skara IF	16	4	9	3	22	–	26	-4	17
6	IF Heimer	16	4	6	6	19	–	27	-8	14
7	Vänersborgs IF	16	4	5	7	19	–	39	-20	13
8	IFK Vänersborg	16	4	1	11	18	–	42	-24	9
9	IK Virgo	16	1	3	12	8	–	38	-30	6

=== Division 2 Sydsvenska Serien 1924–25 ===
	Team	Pld	W	D	L	GF		GA	GD	Pts
1	IS Halmia	14	9	3	2	22	–	13	+9	21
2	Halmstads BK	14	6	6	2	32	–	16	+16	18
3	Varbergs GIF	14	8	1	5	25	–	19	+6	17
4	IFK Helsingborg	14	7	2	5	21	–	18	+3	16
5	Malmö FF	14	6	3	5	35	–	32	+3	15
6	Malmö BI	14	6	2	6	29	–	30	-1	14
7	Falkenbergs GIK	14	2	2	10	8	–	28	-20	6
8	Lunds BK	14	2	1	11	14	–	30	-16	5

=== Svenska Mästerskapet 1924 ===
Final

June 14, 1925

Fässbergs IF	5–0	IK Sirius

Gamla Ullevi, Gothenburg

=== Norrländska Mästerskapet 1925 ===
Final

June 28, 1925

Strands IF	2–1	Bodens BK

?, Hudiksvall

=== Kamratmästerskapen 1924 ===
False final

November 16, 1924

IFK Göteborg	5–1	IFK Stockholm

Ullevi, Gothenburg

Final

April 26, 1925

IFK Göteborg	3–1	IFK Örebro

Örnsro IP, Örebro

== National team results ==
August 31, 1924
Friendly
№ 99

Germany	1–4	Sweden
Harder 28'		Wenzel 19'; Malm 80'; Rydberg 81'; Carlsson 89'

Grünewaldstadion, Berlin
Attendance: 20,000
Referee: Herren (Switzerland)

Sweden: Sigfrid Lindberg - Axel Alfredsson, Arvid Persson - Erik Johansson, Gunnar Holmberg, Erik Andersson - Rune Wenzel, Gunnar Rydberg, Otto Malm, Bror Carlsson, Thorsten Svensson.

September 21, 1924
1924–28 Nordic Championship
№ 100

Sweden	6–1	Norway
Keller 2'; Kaufeldt 44', 54'; Rydell 66', 78', 89'		Berstad 77'

Råsunda IP, Solna
Attendance: 8,000
Referee: Langenus (Belgium)

Sweden: Robert Zander - Douglas Krook, Fritjof Hillén - Henning Helgesson, Sven Friberg, Ivar Klingström - Evert Lundqvist, Sven Rydell, Per Kaufeldt, Tore Keller, Rudolf Kock.

November 9, 1924
Friendly
№ 101

Austria	1–1	Sweden
Wessely 20' (p)		Paulsson 41'

Simmeringer Sportplatz, Vienna
Attendance: 40,000
Referee: Slawick (France)

Sweden: Sigfrid Lindberg - Axel Alfredsson, Douglas Krook - Ernst Hansson, Sven Friberg, Harry Sundberg - Evert Lundqvist, Gunnar Paulsson, Otto Malm, Bror Carlsson, Rudolf Kock.

November 16, 1924
Friendly
№ 102

Italy	2–2	Sweden
Magnozzi 21', 51'		Kaufeldt 13'; Malm 32'

Campo Milan, Milan
Attendance: 25,000
Referee: Vértes (Hungary)

Sweden: Sigfrid Lindberg - Axel Alfredsson, Douglas Krook - Ernst Hansson, Sven Friberg, Harry Sundberg - Evert Lundqvist, Gunnar Paulsson, Otto Malm ( Martin Persson), Per Kaufeldt, Rudolf Kock.

June 9, 1925
Friendly
№ 103

Sweden	4–0	Finland
Johansson 8', 23', 72' (p), 85'

Slottsskogsvallen, Gothenburg
Attendance: 7,500
Referee: Smedvik (Norway)

Sweden: Robert Zander - Herbert Lundgren, Douglas Krook - Åke Hansson, Gunnar Holmberg, Ivar Klingström - Rune Wenzel, Gunnar Paulsson, Otto Malm, Filip Johansson, Evert Lundqvist.

June 14, 1925
1924–28 Nordic Championship
№ 104

Sweden	0–2	Denmark
		Larsen 37'; Nielsen 65'

Stockholms Stadion, Stockholm
Attendance: 19,000
Referee: Watson (England)

Sweden: Sigfrid Lindberg - Herbert Lundgren, Fritjof Hillén - Åke Hansson, Sven Friberg, Ivar Klingström - Rune Wenzel, Sven Rydell, Albert Olsson, Filip Johansson, Evert Lundqvist.

June 21, 1925
Friendly
№ 105

Sweden	1–0	Germany
Johansson 9'

Stockholms Stadion, Stockholm
Attendance: 10,000
Referee: Andersen (Denmark)

Sweden: Sigfrid Lindberg - Axel Alfredsson, Douglas Krook - Åke Hansson, Nils Rosén, Verner Andersson - Rune Wenzel, Filip Johansson, Otto Malm, Tore Keller, Evert Lundqvist.

July 5, 1925
Friendly
№ 106

Sweden	2–4	Austria
Rydell 61'; Keller 82'		Horvath 11', 22', 60'; Swatosch 52'

Stockholms Stadion, Stockholm
Attendance: 15,000
Referee: Bauwens (Germany)

Sweden: Sigfrid Lindberg - Herbert Lundgren, Douglas Krook - Henning Helgesson, Sven Friberg, Ivar Klingström - Rune Wenzel, Sven Rydell, Per Kaufeldt, Tore Keller, Rudolf Kock.

July 12, 1925
Friendly
№ 107

Sweden	6–2	Hungary
Johansson 3', 27', 50'; Rydell 19', 78'; Kaufeldt 84'		Takács 51', 68'

Stockholms Stadion, Stockholm
Attendance: 17,000
Referee: Hansen (Denmark)

Sweden: Sigfrid Lindberg - Axel Alfredsson, Douglas Krook - Henning Helgesson, Sven Friberg, Ivar Klingström - Rune Wenzel, Sven Rydell, Per Kaufeldt, Filip Johansson, Rudolf Kock.

== National team players in season 1924/25 ==
name	pos.	caps	goals	club
Axel "Massa" Alfredsson	DF	5	0	Hälsingborgs IF
Erik "Mickel" Andersson	MF	1	0	IFK Göteborg
Verner "Mickel" Andersson	MF	1	0	IFK Göteborg
Bror "Brollan" Carlsson	FW	2	1	GAIS
Sven Friberg	MF	6	0	Örgryte IS
Åke Hansson	MF	3	0	IFK Göteborg
Ernst "Bagarn" Hansson	MF	2	0	Westermalms IF
Henning "Charmören" Helgesson	MF	3	0	Örgryte IS
Fritjof "Fritte" Hillén	DF	2	0	GAIS
Gunnar "Bajadären" Holmberg	MF	2	0	GAIS
Erik "Snejsarn" Johansson	MF	1	0	GAIS
Filip "Svarte Filip" Johansson	FW	4	8	IFK Göteborg
Per "Pära" Kaufeldt	FW	4	4	AIK
Tore Keller	FW	3	2	IK Sleipner
Ivar "Klinga" Klingström	MF	5	0	Örgryte IS
Rudolf "Putte" Kock	FW	5	0	AIK
Douglas "Världens bäste" Krook	DF	7	0	Örgryte IS
Sigfrid "Sigge" Lindberg	GK	7	0	Hälsingborgs IF
Herbert Lundgren	DF	3	0	GAIS
Evert "Lunkan" Lundqvist	FW	6	0	Örgryte IS
Otto "Petter" Malm	FW	5	2	Hälsingborgs IF
Albert "Abben" Olsson	FW	1	0	GAIS
Gunnar Paulsson	FW	3	1	GAIS
Arvid Persson	DF	1	0	IFK Malmö
Martin "Luttan" Persson	DF	1	0	IFK Stockholm
Nils "Rossi" Rosén	MF	1	0	Hälsingborgs IF
Gunnar "Lillen" Rydberg	FW	1	1	IFK Göteborg
Sven "Trollgubben" Rydell	FW	4	6	Örgryte IS
Harry Sundberg	MF	2	0	Djurgårdens IF
Thorsten Svensson	FW	1	0	GAIS
Rune Wenzel	FW	6	1	GAIS
Robert Zander	GK	2	0	Örgryte IS
