= Erik Levin =

Erik Levin may refer to:

- Erik Levin (footballer, born 1899) (1899–1960), Swedish footballer for IFK Göteborg
- Erik Levin (Malmö FF footballer), Swedish footballer for Malmö FF
