= Helge Andersson =

Helge Andersson may refer to:

- Helge Andersson (footballer, born 1897) (1897–1976), Swedish footballer
- Helge Andersson (footballer, born 1907) (1907–1960), Swedish footballer
