= Sten Mellgren =

Swedish footballer and manager

Olympic medal record

Men's Football
Bronze medal – third place	1924 Paris	Team competition

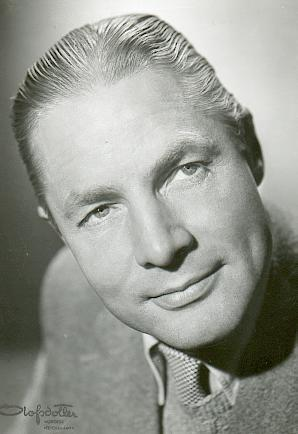
Sten Mellgren

Sten R. E. Mellgren (28 August 1900 – 3 September 1989) was a Swedish football (soccer) player who competed in the 1924 Summer Olympics. He was a member of the Swedish team, which won the bronze medal in the football tournament.

He managed Västerås SK Fotboll.
