= Sven Bergqvist =

Swedish sportsman

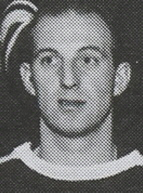
- Sven Bergqvist
- Born: Sven Olof Lennart Bergqvist; 20 August 1914; Stockholm, Sweden
- Died: 16 December 1996 (aged 82); Stockholm, Sweden
Association football career
- Position: Goalkeeper
Senior career*
Years	Team	Apps	(Gls)
1932–1935 1936–1946	Hammarby IF	212	(0)
1936	AIK	0	(0)
International career
1935–1943	Sweden	35	(0)
Managerial career
- 1944–1946: Hammarby IF
- * Club domestic league appearances and goals
Ice hockey career
- Position: Defense
- Played for: Hammarby IF; AIK
- National team: Sweden
- Playing career: 1932–1946
Bandy career
- Playing position: Goalkeeper
Senior career*
Years	Team	Apps^{†}	(Gls)^{†}
- Hammarby
- * Senior club appearances and goals counted for the domestic league only. † Appearances (Goals).

Sven Olof Lennart Bergqvist (20 August 1914 – 16 December 1996) was a Swedish football and ice hockey player, known for representing Hammarby IF in both sports. He also played bandy and handball. Bergqvist is one of only three athletes that has competed in the highest Swedish division in four different sports. He had 35 caps for the Sweden men's national football team between 1935 and 1943, and received the honorary award Stora Grabbars Märke from the Swedish Football Association. He played 55 games for the Sweden men's national ice hockey team at the World Championships and the 1936 Winter Olympics, and was inducted into the IIHF Hall of Fame in 1999.

== Early life ==
Sven Bergqvist grew up in a working-class home in a southern part of Stockholm known as Södermalm. He had several siblings and frequently acted as a ball boy during the football matches of the local club Hammarby IF during his youth, studying his idol Victor Olsson. At the age of 14, in 1928, he began his football career at Hammarby IF.

== Athletic career ==
=== Football ===
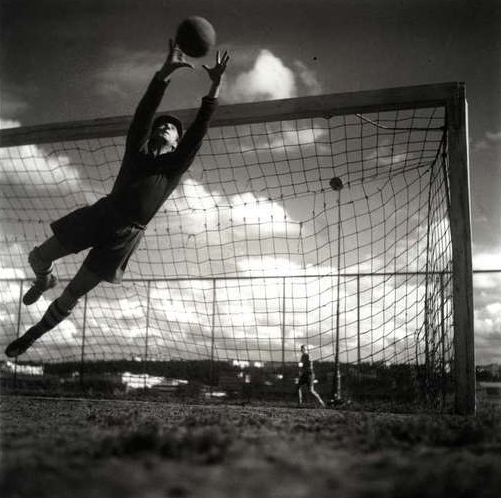
Sven Bergqvist as football goalkeeper.

In 1932, at the age of 17, he debuted in Hammarby's senior football team. Bergqvist stayed as the team's regular goalkeeper until 1935, playing in the Swedish second tier then known as Division 2.

He had a short stint at the Allsvenskan club AIK, during the season of 1936 because the national team required first division players in the Olympics. After the tournament Bergqvist reportedly turned down a move abroad to then French giants Racing Club de Paris, that would have turned Bergqvist into the first professional Swedish footballer.

Bergqvist remained as a prolific player at Hammarby until 1946. During this period he was a part of a successful promotion campaign to Allsvenskan in 1939. Between 1944 and 1946, he also acted as a player-manager of Hammarby. Bergqvist made a total of 212 competitive appearances during his two stints at the club.

He also had 35 caps for the Sweden men's national football team between 1935 and 1943. In his second cap, on 30 June 1935, Sweden defeated Germany in a memorable victory.

His nickname "Svenne Berka" originated from the supporters of Hammarby, who shortened his full name in accordance to the then reigning Stockholm dialect. Alice Babs referred to Bergqvist as "Svenne Berka" in the song "Vårat gäng" during the 1940s. Bergqvist was also characterized as always wearing an own sewn cap on the pitch, which inspired a long lasting fashion trend among male youngsters living in Södermalm.

In 2004, he was voted as Hammarby Fotboll's fifth biggest profile throughout the history of the club. He is also a recipient of the honorary award Stora Grabbars Märke, which is handed out by the Swedish Football Association.

=== Ice hockey ===
Bergqvist was also a prominent ice hockey defender, debuting for Hammarby Hockey in 1932, also aged 17. He would play 13 seasons for the club in the Swedish top division, with Hammarby being crowned champions on five occasions during his tenures: in 1933, 1937, 1942, 1943 and 1945.

He represented AIK during one season in 1935/36, before returning to Hammarby. In total, he made 209 appearances for Hammarby, scoring 63 goals.

He played 55 games for the Sweden men's national ice hockey team during his active career. He appeared in three major tournaments for his country – the 1935 World Ice Hockey Championships in Davos, the Garmisch-Partenkirchen 1936 Winter Olympics and the 1938 World Ice Hockey Championships in Prague – but failed to win any of them.

After his playing career, he made one season as the manager of Hammarby Hockey in 1946. He also coached the Sweden national ice hockey team during the 1948 St. Moritz Winter Olympics, where the team finished in fourth place.

In 1999, Bergqvist was inducted into the IIHF Hall of Fame. He is a recipient of the honorary award Stora Grabbars Märke, which is handed out by Swedish Ice Hockey Association. Only two persons have been awarded the badge in both ice hockey and football.

=== Other sports ===
At the early age of 16, in 1931, he made his debut as a bandy goalie in Hammarby Bandy's senior team. He played another four seasons in the highest Swedish division before quitting. He also represented the Sweden national bandy team.

Bergqvist was also a talented sportsman in handball, playing one game in the highest Swedish division – though not for Hammarby IF, but SoIK Hellas. He was offered to represent the Sweden men's national handball team in the sport of field handball ahead of the 1936 Summer Olympics, but chose to decline.

Bergqvist also competed in the highest Swedish bowling division for the club IK City.

== Later life and death ==
During his athletic career and onwards, Bergqvist worked full-time as a salesman. On 3 December 1955, he was severely injured in an automobile accident and spent the rest of his life in a wheelchair. Bergqvist was a close friend of fellow Hammarby and Sweden national team player Lennart Skoglund, who visited him in the hospital after the incident.

Bergqvist's injuries however did not stop him from continuing to exercise sport at an elite level. He took up archery and was chosen to represent Sweden at the 1960 Summer Paralympics in Rome, but had to decline due to financial reasons, since he would have had to pay all expenses himself.

Bergqvist died on 16 December 1996, at the age of 82. He was buried at the cemetery of Katarina Church, close to his childhood home at Södermalm in Stockholm.

Upon the construction of the Tele2 Arena, Hammarby Fotboll's new home stadium, Bergqvist was honoured with a nearby square being named after him. "Svenne Berkas torg" in Johanneshov was subsequently opened in July 2013.
