= Erik Levin (Malmö FF footballer) =

Swedish footballer

Personal information
- Full name: Erik Levin
- Position: Defender

Senior career*
Years	Team	Apps	(Gls)
1937–1945	Malmö FF	48	(1)
- * Club domestic league appearances and goals

Erik Levin was a Swedish footballer who played as a defender.
