= Konrad Hirsch =

Norwegian-born Swedish footballer

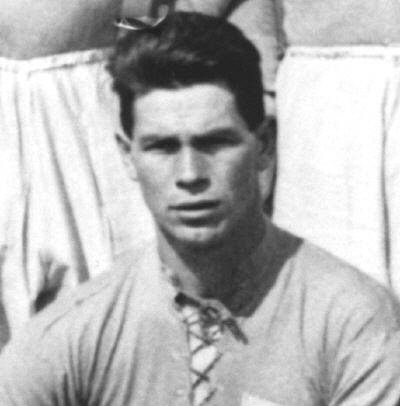

Personal information
- Full name: Konrad Emanuel Nikolaus Hirsch
- Date of birth: 19 May 1900
- Place of birth: Eidskog, Norway
- Date of death: 17 November 1924 (aged 24)
- Place of death: Surte, Sweden
Medal record
Men's football
Representing Sweden
Olympic Games
Bronze medal – third place	1924 Paris	Team competition

Konrad Emanuel Nikolaus Hirsch (19 May 1900 – 17 November 1924) was a Norwegian-born Swedish football (soccer) player who competed in the 1924 Summer Olympics. He was a member of the Swedish team, which won the bronze medal in the football tournament.

Hirsch was born in Eidskog Municipality, Norway and died in Surte, Sweden.
