= Jonsereds IF =

Swedish football club

- Full name: Jonsereds Idrottsförening
- Nickname(s): JIF or Jonsereds IF
- Founded: 1921
- Ground: Jonsereds IP; Jonsered; Sweden
- Capacity: 2,000
- Chairman: Peter Eriksson
- Head coach: Adej Hayek
- Coach: Patrik Dahbo
- League: Division 3 Västra Götaland
- 2017: Division 4 Västra Götaland, 2nd
- Website: https://www.svenskalag.se/jonseredsif
Home colours	Away colours

Jonsereds IF is a Swedish football club located in Jonsered, about 14 km (8.7 mi) east of Gothenburg (Göteborg). The club was founded on 2 May 1923 following the merger of Jonsereds GoIF and Bokedalens IF. Jonsereds IF currently plays in Division 3 Norra Götaland which is the fourth tier of Swedish football. They play their home matches at the Jonsereds IP.

== Background ==
Since their foundation in 1921 Jonsereds IF has participated mainly in the middle divisions of the Swedish football league system. In season of 1923–24, Jonserads were moved to Division 2, Västsvenska Serien. In their first year in the new division, Jonserads finished second behind IFK Uddevalla. They also finished third the next year. Then, after a few years, Jonsereds finished third and were transferred to Division 2 Södra. However, the following season, they finished 10th and were relegated to Division 3. Rebounding quickly, Jonsereds won Division 3 Västsvenska and were promoted to Västra. Their second stint in Division 2 did not progress so quickly and they finished 3rd, 4th, and 3rd again in the next three years. However, their standing quickly fell in the years that followed, and in 1940 they were back in the 3rd Division.

Jonsereds remained in Division 3 until 1966 when they played in Division 4 Göteborg a number of seasons. In the late 1970s they were back in Division 3 and in 1985 they earned a playoff with Skellefteå AIK. Unfortunately for Jonserads they lost the second match 1–0. Undeterred, Jonsereds fought back and three years later, were in Division 1 Södra. They did not fare particularly well, but in 1990 they were transferred to Västra for geographic reasons. After finishing 7th there, they were relegated to Division 2, but immediately promoted again the next season. In 1994, Jonsereds finished 11th in Division 1 Södra, forcing them into a relegation play-off game to keep their place in the division. In the first round of the playoff, they drew with Husqvarna IF 1–1 in the first game, and then won 4–1 in the second, allowing them through to the second round of the playoff. Their next opponent, Norrby IF, beat them 2–0 in the first game, and Jonsereds could not respond, only managing to tie the second game. This loss moved them down a division into Division 2 for the 1995 season.

== Season to season ==
Season	Level	Division	Section	Position	Movements
1993	Tier 2	Division 1	Södra	6th	
1994	Tier 2	Division 1	Södra	11th	Relegation Playoffs – Relegated
1995	Tier 3	Division 2	Västra Götaland	4th	
1996	Tier 3	Division 2	Västra Götaland	9th	
1997	Tier 3	Division 2	Västra Götaland	8th	
1998	Tier 3	Division 2	Västra Götaland	10th	Relegation Playoffs – Relegated
1999	Tier 4	Division 3	Mellersta Götaland	5th	
2000	Tier 4	Division 3	Mellersta Götaland	4th	
2001	Tier 4	Division 3	Mellersta Götaland	4th	
2002	Tier 4	Division 3	Mellersta Götaland	2nd	Promotion Playoffs – Promoted
2003	Tier 3	Division 2	Västra Götaland	9th	
2004	Tier 3	Division 2	Västra Götaland	11th	Relegated
2005	Tier 4	Division 3	Mellersta Götaland	2nd	
2006*	Tier 4	Division 2	Västra Götaland	5th	
2007	Tier 4	Division 2	Västra Götaland	3rd	
2008	Tier 4	Division 2	Västra Götaland	8th	
2009	Tier 4	Division 2	Västra Götaland	3rd	
2010	Tier 4	Division 2	Västra Götaland	6th	
2011	Tier 4	Division 2	Norra Götaland	9th	
2012	Tier 4	Division 2	Västra Götaland	6th	
2013	Tier 4	Division 2	Norra Götaland		

* League restructuring in 2006 resulted in a new division being created at Tier 3 and subsequent divisions dropping a level.
