= Carl Andersson (footballer, born 1900) =

Swedish footballer

Personal information
- Full name: Carl Andersson
- Date of birth: 22 September 1900
- Date of death: 8 January 1981 (aged 80)
- Positions: Winger; defender

Senior career*
Years	Team	Apps	(Gls)
–1920	Tranebergs IF		
1921–1929	Djurgårdens IF		

International career
1924	Sweden	2	(0)
- * Club domestic league appearances and goals

Carl Andersson (22 September 1900 — 8 January 1981) was a Swedish footballer. He made two appearances for Sweden and 18 Allsvenskan appearances for Djurgårdens IF.
