= Thorsten Svensson =

Swedish footballer

Olympic medal record

Men's Football
Bronze medal – third place	1924 Paris	Team competition

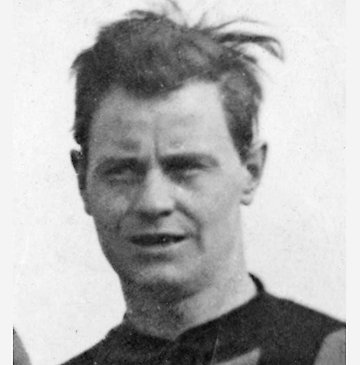
Swefootball thorsten svensson

Thorsten Svensson (October 8, 1901 – June 29, 1954) was a Swedish football player who competed in the 1924 Summer Olympics. He was a member of the Swedish team, which won the bronze medal in the football tournament.
