= Helge Andersson (footballer, born 1897) =

Swedish footballer

Personal information
- Full name: Helge Valentin Andersson
- Date of birth: 25 June 1897
- Place of birth: Stockholm, Sweden
- Date of death: 5 February 1976 (aged 78)
- Place of death: Stockholm, Sweden
- Position: Defender

Senior career*
Years	Team	Apps	(Gls)
- Hammarby

International career
1921–1922	Sweden	2	(0)
- * Club domestic league appearances and goals

Helge Valentin Andersson (25 June 1897 – 5 February 1976) was a Swedish footballer who played for Hammarby. He featured twice for the Sweden men's national football team in 1921 and 1922.

== Career statistics ==
=== International ===
Appearances and goals by national team and year
National team	Year	Apps	Goals
Sweden	1921	1	0
Sweden	1922	1	0
Total		2	0
