= Stora Grabbars och Tjejers Märke =

Swedish sports award

Stora grabbars och tjejers märke (lit. Big Boys' and Girls' Badge) is an honorary award within Swedish sports, created in 1928 by Bo Ekelund. The recipients are called a 'Stor Grabb' (lit. Big Boy) and has to gather a certain number of points according to different rules depending on the sport in question. The title is awarded in several different sports, such as ice hockey, football, athletics, free diving, miniature golf, and others. Since 1989, women can also gain the title, then called Stora tjejers märke (lit. Big Girls' Badge), and the recipient is called a 'Stor tjej' (lit. Big Girl).

== Ice hockey ==
=== Players ===
Since the summer of 1992, to become a 'Stor grabb' within Swedish ice hockey one must achieve 200 points with 100 points through games with the national team (one point per game) and another 100 points by merits.

- Olympic, World Championship and Canada/World Cup victories - 30 merit points.
- Olympic, World Championship and Canada/World Cup silvers - 20 merit points.
- Olympic, World Championship and Canada/World Cup bronze - 10 merit points.
- Game with the national team - 1 merit point.

Furthermore, the player must have participated in at least four competitions of Olympic, World Championship or Canada/World Cup status.

Between 1950 and 1992, the criteria for 'Stor grabb' was half the number, 100 points with 50 points by merits. Merit points also included the European Championships, but had half the value of the Olympic/World championships.

Before the introduction of the points system in 1950, the first 27 'Stor grabb' awards were decided by the SIHA from 1943 until 1949.

=== Referees ===
Referees can also become 'Stor grabb'/'Stor tjej'. The minimum points are 250. Referees can gain a maximum of 25 points per year. Taking part in a (Group A) World Championship, Olympic Games or Canada/World Cup gives 10 bonus points. Of the points at least 25 must come from international assignments and the referee must have an IIHF A-license.

== Trivia ==
- Only two persons have been awarded the badge in both ice hockey and football, Sven Bergqvist and Hans Mild.

== See also ==
- List of athletes awarded Stora grabbars och tjejers märke
- List of bandy players awarded Stora Grabbars och Tjejers Märke
- List of footballers awarded Stora Grabbars och Tjejers Märke
- List of ice hockey players awarded Stora Grabbars och Tjejers Märke
- List of skiers awarded Stora grabbars och tjejers märke
