= Rune Wenzel =

Swedish footballer (1901–1977)

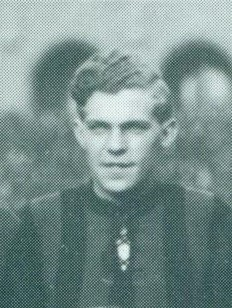
- Rune Wenzel with GAIS, 1919.

Personal information
- Full name: Gösta Elof Rune Wenzel
- Date of birth: 4 January 1901
- Date of death: 29 July 1977 (aged 76)

Youth career
- –1917: Holmens FF

Senior career*
Years	Team	Apps	(Gls)
1918–1932	GAIS	160	(33)
1925	→ IFK Göteborg (loan)	0	(0)

International career
1919–1930	Sweden	30	(1)
- * Club domestic league appearances and goals

Gösta Elof Rune Wenzel (4 January 1901 – 29 July 1977) was a Swedish footballer. He represented GAIS and IFK Göteborg during a career that spanned between 1918 and 1932, winning three Swedish Championships with the former. He played in 30 matches for the Sweden men's national football team from 1919 to 1930. He was also part of Sweden's squad for the football tournament at the 1920 Summer Olympics, but he did not play in any matches.

== Personal life ==
Wenzel was the younger brother of Gunnar Wenzel, who was also a footballer for IFK Göteborg.

== Career statistics ==
=== International ===
Appearances and goals by national team and year
National team	Year	Apps	Goals
Sweden	1919	1	0
Sweden	1920	2	0
Sweden	1921	1	0
Sweden	1922	3	0
Sweden	1923	4	0
Sweden	1924	2	1
Sweden	1925	6	0
Sweden	1926	6	0
Sweden	1927	3	0
Sweden	1928	1	0
Sweden	1929	0	0
Sweden	1930	1	0
Total		30	1

Scores and results list Sweden's goal tally first, score column indicates score after each Wenzel goal.

List of international goals scored by Rune Wenzel
No.	Date	Venue	Opponent	Score	Result	Competition	Ref.
1	31 August 1924	Deutsches Stadion, Berlin, Germany	Germany	1–0	4–1	Friendly	

== Honours ==
GAIS

- Swedish Champion: 1919, 1922, 1930–31

Individual

- Stor Grabb: 1926
