= Erik Levin (footballer, born 1899) =

Swedish footballer

Personal information
- Full name: Axel Erik Leonard Levin
- Date of birth: November 30, 1899
- Place of birth: Gothenburg, Sweden-Norway
- Date of death: October 19, 1960 (aged 60)
- Place of death: New York City, United States
- Height: 5 ft 11 in (1.80 m)
- Position: Full back

Senior career*
Years	Team	Apps	(Gls)
1919–1923	IFK Göteborg		
1924–1925	Indiana Flooring	55	(0)
1925–1926	Bethlehem Steel	1	(0)
1928–1929	New York Nationals	21	(0)

International career
	Sweden	2	(0)
- * Club domestic league appearances and goals

Erik Levin (November 30, 1899 in Gothenburg, Sweden – October 19, 1960 in New York City) was a Swedish football (soccer) full back who played professionally in Sweden and the United States. He earned two caps with the Sweden national team.

== Career ==
Levin played for IFK Göteborg from 1919 to 1923. In 1924, he signed with Indiana Flooring of the American Soccer League. On December 6, 1925, Levin traded to Bethlehem Steel in exchange for Davey Ferguson. In 1928, he joined the New York Nationals before leaving the team and league for good following the 1929 fall season.

Levin also earned two caps with the Sweden national team.
