= Albin Dahl =

Swedish footballer (1900–1980)

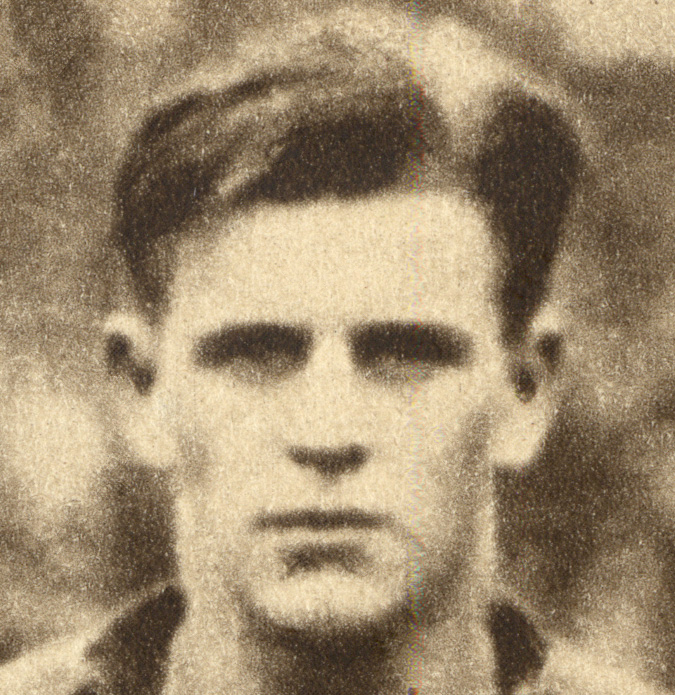
- Dahl circa 1925

Personal information
- Full name: Carl Albin Dahl
- Date of birth: 2 January 1900
- Place of birth: Landskrona, Sweden
- Date of death: 15 February 1980 (aged 80)
- Place of death: Helsingborg, Sweden
- Position: Striker

Senior career*
Years	Team	Apps	(Gls)
1915–1921	Landskrona BoIS	126	(139)
1922–1933	Helsingborgs IF	367	(343)
1933	Växjö BK		
1934	Eslövs AI		
Total		493	(482)

International career
1919–1931	Sweden	29	(21)

Managerial career
- 1934: Eslövs AI
- 1935–1938: Helsingør IF
- 1938–1944: Helsingborgs IF
- 1945–1950: Råå IF
- 1945–1947: Höganäs BK
- 1947–1948: Helsingør IF
- 1951–1953: Helsingborgs IF
- 1954–1956: Landskrona BoIS
- 1956–19XX: Råå IF
Medal record
Representing Sweden
Olympic Games
Bronze medal – third place	1924 Paris	Team
- * Club domestic league appearances and goals

Carl Albin Dahl (2 January 1900 – 15 February 1980) was a Swedish association footballer who played as a striker. He competed in the 1920 and 1924 Summer Olympics and finished in fifth and third place, respectively. Together with his elder brother Harry he came from neighbouring town Landskrona to the larger Helsingborg, and represented Helsingborgs IF. The brother did though return to Landskrona BoIS after only one year. Albin continued his career in Helsingborg until the 1932–33 season. He contributed to Helsingborgs IF winning Allsvenskan, the top tier of Swedish football, three times 1929–30, 1930–31 and 1932–33. He later became manager in several clubs around Helsingborg.
