= Otto Malm (footballer) =

Swedish footballer

Personal information
- Full name: Otto Malm
- Date of birth: 8 February 1890
- Place of birth: Helsingborg, Sweden
- Date of death: 4 July 1969 (aged 79)
- Position: Forward

Senior career*
Years	Team	Apps	(Gls)
1907–1927	Helsingborgs IF		

International career
1913-1925	Sweden	11	(5)
- * Club domestic league appearances and goals

Otto Malm (8 February 1890 – 4 July 1969) was a Swedish footballer who played as a striker for Helsingborgs IF and the Sweden national team.

== Club career ==
Malm was a one-club man for Helsingborgs IF. Malm scored 735 goals in 500 games for Helsingborgs IF. In the 1911–12 season, Malm picked up 69 goals in 24 games and in the 1924–25 season, Malm at least scored 15 goals.

== International career ==
Malm and right winger Georg Bengtsson were the first HIF players to play in the national team. It happened on 18 May 1913 in Budapest against Hungary and they lost 2-0.

The year before, Malm had been an Olympic reserve at home, but never had to be called up to the Solskensol Olympiad in Stockholm. He was selected for the Sweden at Paris Olympics 1924, but declined. At the time, he was 34 years old and justified his decision with the fact that his condition was not the best.
