= Gunnar Olsson (footballer, born 1901) =

Swedish footballer

Personal information
- Date of birth: 27 March 1901
- Date of death: 4 May 1960 (aged 59)

International career
Years	Team	Apps	(Gls)
1923–1932	Sweden	10	(4)

Gunnar Olsson (27 March 1901 – 4 May 1960) was a Swedish footballer. He played in ten matches for the Sweden men's national football team from 1923 to 1932. He was also part of Sweden's squad for the football tournament at the 1924 Summer Olympics, but he did not play in any matches.
