= Grycksbo IF =

Swedish sports club

- Full name: Grycksbo idrottsförening
- Sport: bandy, orienteering, skiing, soccer
- Founded: 1908
- Based in: Grycksbo, Sweden
- Stadium: Tansvallen

Grycksbo IF is a sports club in Grycksbo, Sweden, established in 1908. The club runs bandy, orienteering, skiing and soccer. The men's bandy team played in the Swedish top division in the season of 1963–1964.

Three-time Vasaloppet winner Daniel Tynell first competed for Grycksbo IF.
