= Harry Dahl (footballer) =

Swedish footballer (1902–1986)

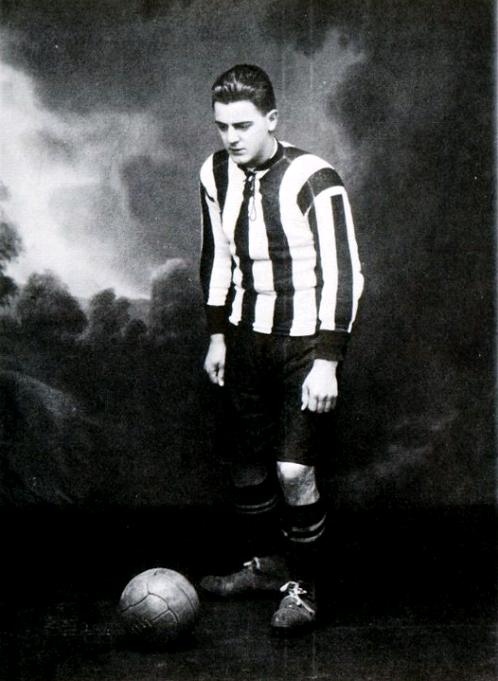
- Harry "Hacke" Dahl, in the black and white striped colours of Landskrona BoIS

Personal information
- Date of birth: 25 June 1902
- Date of death: 2 December 1986 (aged 84)
- Position: Forward

Youth career
- BK Argos

Senior career*
Years	Team	Apps	(Gls)
–1921	Landskrona BoIS		
1922	Helsingborgs IF		
1923–1932	Landskrona BoIS		

International career
1922–1930	Sweden	12	(8)
- * Club domestic league appearances and goals

Harry Dahl (25 June 1902 – 2 December 1986), nicknamed Hacke, was a Swedish footballer who played as a forward. His older brother Albin Dahl was also a footballer.

== Career ==
With 334 goals, he is Landskrona BoIS's top goal scorer of all time. Also like his brother, he began to play football in a Landsrona-based club called BK Argos. When Landskrona BoIS was founded in 1915, Albin began to play for them, but Harry was too young. A few years later he was old enough to join his brother Albin in Landskrona BoIS. As soon as 1922, both he and Albin moved to neighbouring Helsingborg to play for Landskrona rivals Helsingborg IF. Unlike Albin, Harry only played one season in Helsingborg and then returned to Landskrona and BoIS in conjunction with the inaugural season of the first national Swedish league, Allsvenskan. Harry played eight seasons in Allsvenskan and retired after the 1931–32 season at age 30.

His hope of playing for Sweden at the 1924 Olympics in Paris was thwarted by his supervisor at his workplace, Thulinverken, who refused to allow him to go.
