= Fritjof Hillén =

Swedish footballer

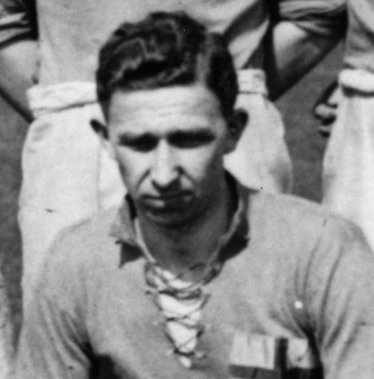
- Hillén at the 1924 Summer Olympics

Personal information
- Full name: Elof Fritjof Valentin Hillén
- Date of birth: 19 May 1893
- Place of birth: Gothenburg, Sweden
- Date of death: 7 November 1977 (aged 84)
- Position: Defender

Senior career*
Years	Team	Apps	(Gls)
1910–1926	GAIS		

International career
1917–1925	Sweden	15	(0)
Medal record
Olympic medal record
Men's Football
Bronze medal – third place	1924 Paris	Team competition
- * Club domestic league appearances and goals

Elof Fritjof Valentin Hillén (19 May 1893 – 7 November 1977) was a Swedish footballer who played as a defender for GAIS and the Sweden national team. He competed in the 1924 Summer Olympics as a member of the Swedish team which won the bronze medal in the football tournament. He made his debut for the Swedish national team on 3 June 1917. Dagens Nyheter described him as one of the country's most well-known footballers in 1924. He was awarded the Stora Grabbars Märke in 1926.
