= Robert Zander =

Swedish footballer (1895–1966)

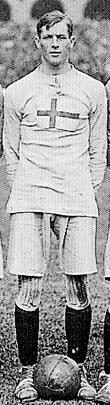
- Zander with Sweden in August 1919, ahead of a game against the Netherlands at the Stockholm Stadium.

Personal information
- Full name: Adolf Robert Zander
- Date of birth: 18 September 1895
- Place of birth: Luleå, Sweden
- Date of death: 27 June 1966 (aged 70)
- Place of death: Gothenburg, Sweden
- Position: Goalkeeper

Senior career*
Years	Team	Apps	(Gls)
1919	IFK Göteborg		
1920–1927	Örgryte IS		
- Redbergslids IK

International career
1918–1926	Sweden	20	(0)
- * Club domestic league appearances and goals

Adolf Robert Zander (18 September 1895 – 27 June 1966) was a Swedish footballer who played as a goalkeeper.

== Club career ==
Zander is best remembered for representing Örgryte IS, which he helped win the 1925–26 Allsvenskan. He played in 57 games for the team between 1924 and 1927. He also represented IFK Göteborg and Redbergslids IK during his career.

== International career ==
A Swedish international between 1918 and 1926, Zander represented the Sweden national team at the 1920 and 1924 Summer Olympics. He won a total of 20 caps for the Sweden national team and was named Stor Grabb in 1926.

== Personal life ==
Zander is the great-grandfather of the current professional footballer Gustav Ludwigson who played for Örgryte IS in 2018 and 2019.

== Career statistics ==
=== International ===
Appearances and goals by national team and year
National team	Year	Apps	Goals
Sweden	1918	1	0
Sweden	1919	4	0
Sweden	1920	6	0
Sweden	1921	1	0
Sweden	1922	0	0
Sweden	1923	2	0
Sweden	1924	3	0
Sweden	1925	1	0
Sweden	1926	2	0
Total		20	0

== Honours ==
Örgryte IS

- Allsvenskan: 1925–26

International

- Summer Olympics bronze: 1924

Individual

- Stor Grabb: 1926
