= Evert Lundqvist =

Swedish footballer

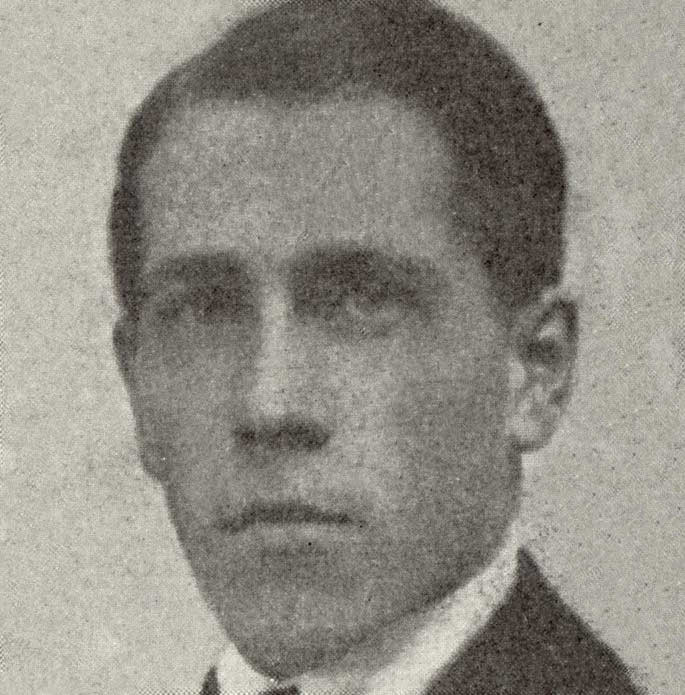

Personal information
- Born: 27 February 1900 Gothenburg, Sweden
- Died: 19 February 1979 (aged 78) Västra Frölunda, Sweden

Sport
- Sport: Football
- Club: Örgryte IS, Göteborg
Medal record
Representing Sweden
Olympic Games
Bronze medal – third place	1924 Paris	Team

Evert Viktor Lundquist (27 February 1900 – 19 February 1979) was a Swedish association football player who won a bronze medal at the 1924 Summer Olympics. In 1924–27 he played nine international matches and scored one goal. He later worked as a security guard at the amusement park Liseberg in Göteborg.
