= Gunnar Holmberg =

Swedish footballer (1897–1975)

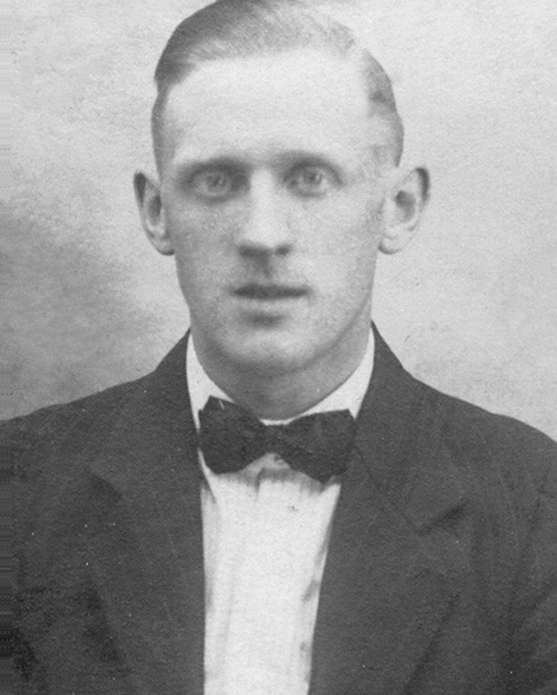

Personal information
- Born: 6 May 197 Gothenburg, Sweden
- Died: 21 October 1975 (aged 75) Borås, Sweden

Sport
- Sport: Football
- Club: GAIS, Göteborg
Medal record
Representing Sweden
Olympic Games
Bronze medal – third place	1924 Paris	Team

Gunnar Josef Agaton Holmberg (6 May 1897 – 21 October 1975) was a Swedish association footballer who won a bronze medal at the 1924 Summer Olympics. He had a nickname bajadär (devadasi) because his footwork resembled an Indian dance.
