= Putte Kock =

Swedish sportsman

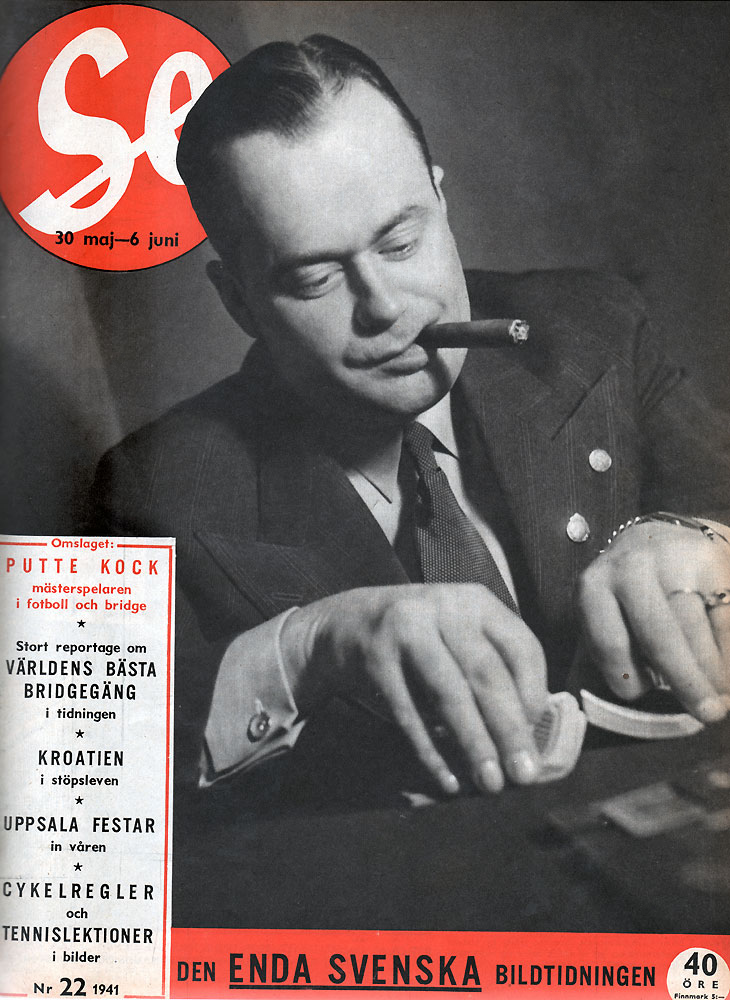
- Kock at the card table in 1941 (cover of the Swedish weekly magazine Se)

Personal information
- Full name: Rudolf Kock
- Date of birth: 29 June 1901
- Place of birth: Stockholm, Sweden
- Date of death: 31 October 1979 (aged 78)
- Place of death: Stockholm, Sweden
- Position: Left wing

Youth career
- AIK

Senior career*
Years	Team	Apps	(Gls)
1915–1928	AIK		
1926	→ US Suisse (loan)	1	(0)

International career
1919–1925	Sweden	37	(12)

Managerial career
- 1932–1934: Djurgården
- 1943–1956: Sweden (as chairman of the Selection Committee)
Medal record
Representing Sweden
Olympic Games
Bronze medal – third place	1924 Paris	Football team
European Championships
Silver medal – second place	1922 St. Moritz	Ice hockey team
- * Club domestic league appearances and goals

Rudolf "Putte" Kock (29 June 1901 – 31 October 1979) was a Swedish football, ice hockey and bridge player who won a bronze medal in the 1924 Summer Olympics as a football player, being voted the best left winger after the tournament. He also made six caps for the Swedish ice hockey team, including the Ice Hockey European Championship 1922, and scored five goals.

After having to end his career prematurely due to a knee injury, he worked as a football coach with AIK's rivals Djurgården and with the national team (1943–1956). Together with George Raynor he qualified Sweden for the 1948 Summer Olympics where they won gold, the 1950 FIFA World Cup (bronze) and the 1952 Summer Olympics (bronze).

After his coaching career Kock became a well-known sports commentator on Swedish television.

== Bridge accomplishments ==
- World Team Championships (Bermuda Bowl)

Placed third representing Sweden and Iceland in 1950
Placed second representing Sweden in 1953

- European Team Championships

Placed first representing Sweden in 1939 and 1952
Placed second representing Sweden in 1948, 1949 and 1950
