= Harry Sundberg =

Swedish footballer

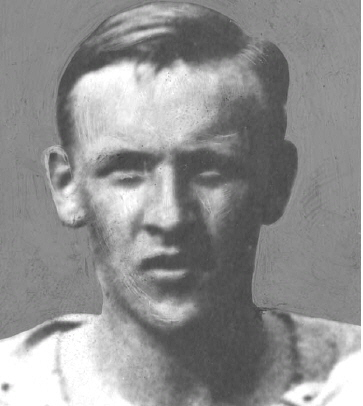

Personal information
- Date of birth: 9 January 1898
- Date of death: 16 May 1945 (aged 47)

Senior career*
Years	Team	Apps	(Gls)
- Djurgårdens IF
Medal record
Sweden
Bronze medal – third place	1924 Paris	Team
- * Club domestic league appearances and goals

Harry Sundberg (9 January 1898 – 16 May 1945) was a Swedish football player who competed in the 1924 Summer Olympics. He was a member of the Swedish team, which won the bronze medal in the football tournament.

== Honours ==
=== Club ===
Djurgårdens IF

- Svenska Mästerskapet: 1920
