= Ivar Klingström =

Swedish footballer

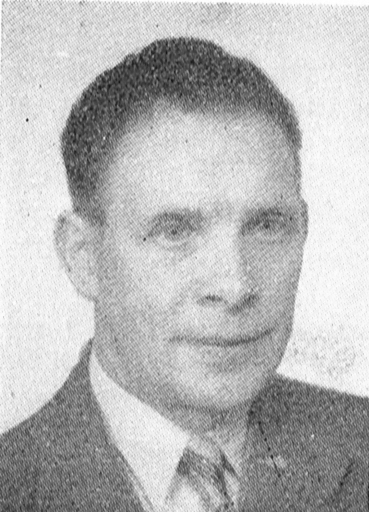

Personal information
- Date of birth: 1 August 1897
- Date of death: 29 September 1993 (aged 96)
- Position: Midfielder

Senior career*
Years	Team	Apps	(Gls)
- IK Virgo
1919–1928	Örgryte IS		

International career
1919–1927	Sweden	24	(0)
- * Club domestic league appearances and goals

Ivar Klingström (1 August 1897 – 29 September 1993) was a Swedish footballer who played as a midfielder.
