= Denmark at the 1928 Summer Olympics =

- IOC code: DEN
- NOC: Danish Olympic Committee

in Amsterdam
- Competitors: 91 in 14 sports
- Flag bearer: Marius Jørgensen
- Medals Ranked 13th: Gold 3 Silver 1 Bronze 2 Total 6

Summer Olympics appearances (overview)
- 1896; 1900; 1904; 1908; 1912; 1920; 1924; 1928; 1932; 1936; 1948; 1952; 1956; 1960; 1964; 1968; 1972; 1976; 1980; 1984; 1988; 1992; 1996; 2000; 2004; 2008; 2012; 2016; 2020; 2024; 2028

Other related appearances
- 1906 Intercalated Games

Denmark competed at the 1928 Summer Olympics in Amsterdam, Netherlands. 91 competitors (82 men and 9 women) took part in 55 events in 14 sports.

== Medalists ==
Medal	Name	Sport	Event	Date
Gold	Henry Hansen	Cycling	Men's individual road race	August 7
Gold	Henry Hansen, Orla Jørgensen, Leo Nielsen	Cycling	Men's team road race	August 7
Gold	Willy Hansen	Cycling	Men's track time trial	August 5
Silver	Aage Høy-Petersen, Sven Linck, Niels Otto Møller, Peter Schlütter, Vilhelm Vett	Sailing	6 m class	August 9
Bronze	Michael Michaelsen	Boxing	Men's heavyweight	August 11
Bronze	Willy Hansen	Cycling	Men's sprint	August 6

== Aquatics ==
=== Diving ===
1 diver, a woman, represented Denmark in 1928. It was the nation's third appearance in the sport. Edith Nielsen, who had taken 4th place in the 10 metre platform event in 1924, competed again. This time, she did not advance out of the preliminary groups. She finished 6th in her group.

Diver	Event	Semifinals			Final		
Diver	Event	Points	Score	Rank	Points	Score	Rank
Edith Nielsen	Women's 10 metre platform	29	26.20	6	did not advance		

=== Swimming ===
Five swimmers, all women, represented Denmark in 1928. It was the nation's 5th appearance in the sport. Jacobsen was the only Danish swimmer to advance to an event final; she placed 4th in the 200 metre breaststroke.

Swimmer	Event	Heat		Semifinal		Final	
Swimmer	Event	Time	Rank	Time	Rank	Time	Rank
Gerda Bredgaard	Women's 100 m freestyle	Unknown	4	did not advance			
Agnete Olsen	Women's 100 m freestyle	1:15.8	1 Q	Unknown	6	did not advance	
Else Jacobsen	Women's 100 m backstroke	—N/a		1:31.5	4	did not advance	
Else Jacobsen	Women's 200 m breaststroke	3:17.6	1 Q	3:16.8	2 Q	3:19.0	4
Gerda Bredgaard	Women's 4 × 100 metre freestyle relay	—N/a		Unknown	4	did not advance	
Agnete Olsen	Women's 4 × 100 metre freestyle relay	—N/a		Unknown	4	did not advance	
Rigmor Olsen	Women's 4 × 100 metre freestyle relay	—N/a		Unknown	4	did not advance	
Lilian Staugaard	Women's 4 × 100 metre freestyle relay	—N/a		Unknown	4	did not advance	

== Athletics ==
10 athletes, all men, represented Denmark in 1928. It was the nation's 7th appearance in the sport as well as the Games. None of the Danish athletes advanced past the initial round of their events. Nikolajsen's 10th place finish in the pole vault was the best ranking for Denmark in athletics in Amsterdam.

Track and road events

Athlete	Event	Heat		Quarterfinal		Semifinal		Final	
Athlete	Event	Result	Rank	Result	Rank	Result	Rank	Result	Rank
Leo Jørgensen	Men's 100 metres	Unknown	4	did not advance					
Louis Lundgren	Men's 400 metres	Unknown	3	did not advance					
Albert Larsen	Men's 800 metres	—N/a		Unknown	6	did not advance			
Albert Larsen	Men's 1500 metres	—N/a				4:01.5	4	did not advance	
Carl Petersen	Men's 5000 metres	—N/a				15:13.0	6	did not advance	
Louis Lundgren	Men's 110 metres hurdles	—N/a		15.7	5	did not advance			
Herman Larsen	Men's 400 metres hurdles	—N/a		1:00.0	5	did not advance			
Louis Lundgren	Men's 400 metres hurdles	—N/a		55.9	3	did not advance			
Gottlieb Bach	Men's marathon	—N/a						3:10:10	51
Aksel Madsen	Men's marathon	—N/a						DNF	–
Orla Olsen	Men's marathon	—N/a						DNF	–

Field events

Athlete	Event	Qualification		Final	
Athlete	Event	Distance	Position	Distance	Position
Hermann Brügmann	Men's long jump	6.62	30	did not advance	
Hermann Brügmann	Men's triple jump	13.82	18	did not advance	
Aksel Nikolajsen	Men's pole vault	3.50	10	did not advance	

== Boxing ==
Six boxers represented Denmark in 1928. The sport was open to men only. It was Denmark's 4th appearance in Olympic boxing. Nielsen, the defending champion in the lightweight, was one of two Danish boxers to reach the semifinals, along with Michaelsen. Both men lost there. Michaelsen earned Denmark's only boxing medal in 1928 by winning the subsequent bronze medal bout; Nielsen lost his bronze medal bout to finish fourth.

Boxer	Event	Round of 32	Round of 16	Quarterfinals	Semifinals	Final / Bronze match	
Boxer	Event	Opposition Result	Opposition Result	Opposition Result	Opposition Result	Opposition Result	Rank
Aage Fahrenholtz	Men's bantamweight	Bye	Harry Isaacs (RSA); L points	did not advance			9
Ricardt Madsen	Men's featherweight	George Kelly (IRL); W points	Jean Boireau (FRA); L points	did not advance			9
Hans Jacob Nielsen	Men's lightweight	Bye	Mathias Sancassiani (LUX); W points	David Baan (NED); W points	Carlo Orlandi (ITA); L points	Gunnar Berggren (SWE); L points	4
Arne Sande	Men's welterweight	Patrick Lenehan (IRL); L points	did not advance				17
Ingvard Ludvigsen	Men's middleweight	Bye	Piero Toscani (ITA); L points	did not advance			9
Michael Michaelsen	Men's heavyweight	—N/a	Bye	Georges Gardebois (FRA); W points	Arturo Rodríguez (ARG); L points	Sverre Sørsdal (NOR); W points	3rd place, bronze medalist(s)

== Cycling ==
Five cyclists, all men, represented Denmark in 1928. It was the nation's 4th appearance in the sport. Prior to 1928, Denmark's best result in the sport had been a silver medal in the tandem in 1924. Willy Hansen, one of the members of that tandem, won Denmark's first Olympic cycling championship in the track time trial. Two days later, the road race team, led by Henry Hansen, won the second and third gold medals for Denmark in cycling with a team victory and an individual championship for Hansen. Willy Hansen also earned a bronze medal in the sprint, finishing his Olympic career with one medal of each color.

=== Road cycling ===
Cyclist	Event	Time	Rank
Henry Hansen	Men's road race	4:47:18	1st place, gold medalist(s)
Orla Jørgensen	Men's road race	5:16:19	25
Leo Nielsen	Men's road race	5:05:37	7
Poul Sørensen	Men's road race	5:17:33	28
Henry Hansen	Men's team road race	15:09:14	1st place, gold medalist(s)
Orla Jørgensen	Men's team road race	15:09:14	1st place, gold medalist(s)
Leo Nielsen	Men's team road race	15:09:14	1st place, gold medalist(s)

=== Track cycling ===
Time trial

Cyclist	Event	Time	Rank
Willy Hansen	Men's time trial	1:14.2	1st place, gold medalist(s)

Match races

Cyclist	Event	1st Round		Repechage 1		Repechage Final		Quarterfinals		Semifinals		Final / Bronze match	
Cyclist	Event	Time	Rank	Time	Rank	Time	Rank	Time	Rank	Time	Rank	Time	Rank
Willy Hansen	Men's sprint	Unknown	1 Q	Bye				13.2	1 Q	Unknown	2	Unknown	1 (bronze)

== Equestrian ==
Three equestrians, all men, represented Denmark in 1928. It was the nation's 3rd appearance in the sport. One rider, Magnus Fog, competed in the dressage competition, finishing in 16th place. Denmark sent two riders in eventing; Peder Jensen finished 9th while Cai Gundelach did not finish.

=== Dressage ===
Equestrian	Horse	Event	Final	
Equestrian	Horse	Event	Score	Rank
Magnus Fog	Mistinguett	Dressage	202.08	16

=== Eventing ===
Equestrian	Horse	Event	Final	
Equestrian	Horse	Event	Score	Rank
Cai Gundelach	Beauty	Eventing	DNF	–
Peder Jensen	Pearl	Eventing	1885.24	9

== Fencing ==
Ten fencers, seven men and three women, represented Denmark in 1928. It was the nation's 7th appearance in the sport as well as the Games. Ivan Joseph Martin Osiier fenced in his 5th Olympics (he would compete twice more, in 1932 and 1948). For the first time since 1908, no Danish fencers advanced to the finals.

Fencer	Event	Round 1		Quarterfinals		Semifinals		Final	
Fencer	Event	Result	Rank	Result	Rank	Result	Rank	Result	Rank
Jens Berthelsen	Men's épée	6 wins	3 Q	8 wins	1 Q	3 wins	7	did not advance	
Ivan Joseph Martin Osiier	Men's épée	6 wins	4 Q	7 wins	3 Q	3 wins	7	did not advance	
Peter Ryefelt	Men's épée	5 wins	4 Q	2 wins	10	did not advance			
Otto Bærentzen	Men's team épée	0–2	3	did not advance					
Jens Berthelsen	Men's team épée	0–2	3	did not advance					
Ivan Joseph Martin Osiier	Men's team épée	0–2	3	did not advance					
Johan Praem	Men's team épée	0–2	3	did not advance					
Peter Ryefelt	Men's team épée	0–2	3	did not advance					
Kim Bærentzen	Men's foil	—N/a		3 wins	4	did not advance			
Jens Berthelsen	Men's foil	—N/a		1 wins	5	did not advance			
Ivan Joseph Martin Osiier	Men's foil	—N/a		5 wins	1 Q	3 wins	5	did not advance	
Else Ahlmann-Ohlsen	Women's foil	—N/a		0 wins	7	did not advance			
Margot Bærentzen	Women's foil	—N/a		2 wins	5	did not advance			
Inger Klint	Women's foil	—N/a		2 wins	7	did not advance			
Kim Bærentzen	Men's team foil	2–1	2 Q	0–2	3	did not advance			
Jens Berthelsen	Men's team foil	2–1	2 Q	0–2	3	did not advance			
Ivan Joseph Martin Osiier	Men's team foil	2–1	2 Q	0–2	3	did not advance			
Johan Praem	Men's team foil	2–1	2 Q	0–2	3	did not advance			
Jens Berthelsen	Men's sabre	—N/a		3 wins	3 Q	3 wins	5	did not advance	
Ivan Joseph Martin Osiier	Men's sabre	—N/a		3 wins	2 Q	3 wins	5	did not advance	
Viggo Stilling-Andersen	Men's sabre	—N/a		2 wins	5	did not advance			

== Field hockey ==
Denmark competed in men's field hockey for the second time in 1928. The defending silver medalist, Denmark won its first two matches before falling to India and Belgium in group play to finish 3rd in their group. The team shared 5th place overall with the 3rd-place team in the other group, France.

Summary

Team	Event	Group Stage					Final / BM	
Team	Event	Opposition Score	Opposition Score	Opposition Score	Opposition Score	Rank	Opposition Score	Rank
Denmark men's	Men's tournament	Switzerland; W 2–1	Austria; W 3–1	India; L 5–0	Belgium; L 1–0	3	Did not advance	5

=== Men's tournament ===
Team roster

The following is the Denmark roster in the men's field hockey tournament of the 1928 Summer Olympics.

- Arne Blach
- Otto Busch
- Hagbarth Dahlmann
- Aage Heimann
- Niels Heilbuth
- Henning Holst
- Erik Husted
- Otto Husted
- Peter Koefoed
- Henry Madsen
- Carl Malling
- Børge Monberg
- Peter Prahm
- Aage Norsker

Group play

Pos	Team	Pld	W	D	L	GF	GA	GD	Pts	Qualification
1	India	4	4	0	0	26	0	+26	8	Gold medal match
2	Belgium	4	3	0	1	8	9	−1	6	Bronze medal match
3	Denmark	4	2	0	2	5	8	−3	4	
4	Switzerland	4	1	0	3	2	11	−9	2	
5	Austria	4	0	0	4	1	14	−13	0	

Source: 1928 Official Report, p. 685

17 May 1928
15:50

Switzerland	1–2	Denmark
Loubert ?'	Report	Husted 16'; Holst ?'

Umpires:
L. J. Quarles van Ufford (NED)
M. J. Vandekerckhove (BEL)

18 May 1928
19:00

Denmark	3–1	Austria
Holst 4', 6'; Heilbuth 34'	Report	Lichteneckert ?'

Umpires:
A. Broese van Croenou (NED)
R. Jassoy (GER)

20 May 1928
16:00

India	5–0	Denmark
Chand 4', 26', 51', 54'; Seaman 65'	Report

Umpires:
R. Jassoy (GER)
J. Daubresse (FRA)

24 May 1928
16:00

Denmark	0–1	Belgium
	Report	Seeldrayers 60'

Umpires:
W. Simon (GER)
R. Be-Cavin (SUI)

== Modern pentathlon ==
Two pentathletes, both men, represented Denmark in 1928. It was the nation's fourth appearance in the sport. Denmark was one of five nations to have competed in each edition of the Olympic modern pentathlon. Both of the Danish pentathletes had competed previously in 1924, with Jensen placing 6th and Olsen 15th. The two started off well, placing 4th and 2nd in the shooting event. Olsen, however, finished last in the swimming portion. Jensen fared better in the pool, but still fell well beyond the leaders. Strong performances by both in fencing (with Jensen leading the entire group) made up some ground and put Jensen in contention for the podium. Neither man was able to achieve more than a middle-of-the-pack result in running or equestrian, however, and they finished in 10th (Jensen) and 14th (Olsen) overall among the 37 competitors.

Pentathlete	Event	Shooting	Swimming	Fencing	Running	Equestrian	Total	
Pentathlete	Event	Rank	Rank	Rank	Rank	Rank	Score	Rank
Helge Jensen	Men's individual	4	20	1	29	19	73	10
Otto Olsen	Men's individual	2	37	6	11	26	82	14

== Rowing ==
Ten rowers, all men, represented Denmark in 1928. It was the nation's 3rd appearance in the sport, and first since 1920. Denmark entered two boats, a single scull and an eight. Both boats had the same result: a first-round loss, advancement through the first repechage, and a second-round loss eliminating the boat.

Rower	Event	Round 1		Repechage 1		Round 2		Repechage 2		Round 3		Semifinals		Final	
Rower	Event	Time	Rank	Time	Rank	Time	Rank	Time	Rank	Time	Rank	Time	Rank	Time	Rank
Arnold Schwartz	Men's single sculls	8:06.0	2 R	8:20.2	1 Q	7:47.6	2	did not advance							
Svend Aage Grønvold	Men's eight	6:35.6	2 R	6:53.2	1 Q	6:48.4	2	did not advance							
Ernst Friborg Jensen	Men's eight	6:35.6	2 R	6:53.2	1 Q	6:48.4	2	did not advance							
Knud Olsen	Men's eight	6:35.6	2 R	6:53.2	1 Q	6:48.4	2	did not advance							
Carl Schmidt	Men's eight	6:35.6	2 R	6:53.2	1 Q	6:48.4	2	did not advance							
Georg Sjøht	Men's eight	6:35.6	2 R	6:53.2	1 Q	6:48.4	2	did not advance							
Bernhardt Møller Sørensen	Men's eight	6:35.6	2 R	6:53.2	1 Q	6:48.4	2	did not advance							
Sigfred Sørensen	Men's eight	6:35.6	2 R	6:53.2	1 Q	6:48.4	2	did not advance							
Willy Sørensen	Men's eight	6:35.6	2 R	6:53.2	1 Q	6:48.4	2	did not advance							
Harry Gregersen (cox)	Men's eight	6:35.6	2 R	6:53.2	1 Q	6:48.4	2	did not advance							

== Sailing ==
Five sailors, all men, represented Denmark in 1928. It was the nation's third appearance in the sport. For the third time, Denmark took the silver medal in the 6 metre class. The Hi-Hi barely qualified for the final three races (only boats which had placed at least 3rd in one of the first four races continued to compete), but finished by winning both the sixth and seventh race. This put the boat in second place behind the Norwegian Norna, which had won 3 races, and ahead of the Estonian Tutti V, which had won 1. In the dinghy class, Andersen took 2nd in the first race and 4th in the next three. This gave him enough net points to survive the 10-boat cut in that event. His results in the fifth and sixth races did not improve his position, however, and he did not start the seventh and eighth. He ultimately finished in seventh place, behind the Italian boat (which had two 2nd-place finished) and ahead of the British boat (which matched Andersen's single 2nd-place, but had only one 4th-place finish to his three).

Dinghy

Sailor	Event	Preliminary series				Net points	Prelim rank	Final series				Results	Rank
Sailor	Event	1	2	3	4	Net points	Prelim rank	1	2	3	4	Results	Rank
Jacob Andersen	12' Dinghy	2	4	4	4	14	4	5	8	10 DNS	10 DNS	1 x 2nd 3 x 4th	7

6 metre and 8 metre classes

Sailor	Event	1	2	3	4	5	6	7	Results	Rank
Vilhelm Vett (helm)	6 Metre	11th	3rd	12th DQ	6th	6th	1st	1st	2 × 1st	2nd place, silver medalist(s)
Aage Høy-Petersen	6 Metre	11th	3rd	12th DQ	6th	6th	1st	1st	2 × 1st	2nd place, silver medalist(s)
Niels Otto Møller	6 Metre	11th	3rd	12th DQ	6th	6th	1st	1st	2 × 1st	2nd place, silver medalist(s)
Peter Schlütter	6 Metre	11th	3rd	12th DQ	6th	6th	1st	1st	2 × 1st	2nd place, silver medalist(s)

== Weightlifting ==
One male weightlifter represented Denmark in 1928. It was the nation's third appearance in the sport and first since 1920. Nissen competed in the lightweight class, finishing last of the 16 men who finished the competition (2 did not finish).

Lifter	Event	Press		Snatch		Clean & Jerk		Total	Rank
Lifter	Event	Result	Rank	Result	Rank	Result	Rank	Total	Rank
Henry Nissen	Men's −67.5 kg	70	15	75	15	105	12	245	16

== Wrestling ==
Seven wrestlers, all men, represented Denmark in 1928. It was the nation's 5th appearance in the sport. Denmark had wrestlers in 2 of the 7 freestyle weight classes and all 6 of the Greco-Roman weight classes, with Johannes Jacobsen competing in both styles.

Both Danish freestyle wrestlers lost in the round of 16. Jørgensen, however, had lost to the eventual gold medalist and therefore advanced to the silver medal tournament under the Bergvall system in use at the time. He won his semifinal bout there, but lost in the silver medal final. (It is not clear why he did not compete in the bronze medal tournament.)

Jacobsen had the best performance among the Greco-Roman wrestlers, winning his first three bouts before two consecutive losses (separated by a bye) put him over the 5 point elimination threshold. He finished in 4th place. Three other Danish wrestlers earned two wins before being eliminated. Larsen was the only Dane to not win a single bout in Greco-Roman.

=== Freestyle wrestling ===
Wrestler	Event	Gold medal rounds				Silver medal rounds		Bronze medal rounds		Rank
Wrestler	Event	Round of 16	Quarterfinals	Semifinals	Final	Semifinals	Final	Semifinals	Final	Rank
Wrestler	Event	Opposition Result	Opposition Result	Opposition Result	Opposition Result	Opposition Result	Opposition Result	Opposition Result	Opposition Result	Rank
Carlo Jørgensen	Men's lightweight	Käpp (EST); L	did not advance			Berryman (USA); W	Pacôme (FRA); L	—N/a	Not qualified	5
Johannes Jacobsen	Men's welterweight	Roosen (BEL); L	did not advance			Not qualified		Not qualified		10

=== Greco-Roman wrestling ===
Athlete	Event	Round 1	Round 2	Round 3	Round 4	Round 5	Round 6	Round 7	Rank
Athlete	Event	Opposition Result	Opposition Result	Opposition Result	Opposition Result	Opposition Result	Opposition Result	Opposition Result	Rank
Herman Andersen	Men's bantamweight	Maudr (TCH); L Decision 3pts	Conkeroğlu (TUR); W Fall 3pts	Pütsep (EST); W Fall 3pts	Lindelöf (SWE); L Decision 6pts	did not advance		—N/a	7
Aage Meyer	Men's featherweight	Dillen (BEL); L Decision 3pts	Mazurek (POL); W Fall 3pts	Rey (ARG); W Fall 3pts	Malmberg (SWE); L Decision 6pts	did not advance			6
Einar Borges	Men's lightweight	Mumenthaler (SUI); W Decision 1pt	Janssens (BEL); L Decision 4pts	Vávra (TCH); L Fall 7pts	did not advance				11
Johannes Jacobsen	Men's middleweight	Baytorun (TUR); W Fall 0pts	Frei (SUI); W Fall 0pts	Bonassin (ITA); W Fall 0pts	Kusnets (EST); L Decision 3pts	Bye	Kokkinen (FIN); L Fall 6pts	—N/a	4
Ejnar Hansen	Men's light heavyweight	Rieger (GER); L Decision 3pts	Gałuszka (POL); W Fall 3pts	Gaupset (NOR); W Fall 3pts	Moustafa (EGY); L Fall 6pts	did not advance		—N/a	5
Emil Larsen	Men's heavyweight	Gehring (GER); L Fall 3pts	Çoban (TUR); L Fall 6pts	did not advance				—N/a	11
