= Argentina at the 1928 Summer Olympics =

- IOC code: ARG
- NOC: Argentine Olympic Committee

in Amsterdam
- Competitors: 81 in 12 sports
- Flag bearer: Héctor Méndez
- Medals Ranked 12th: Gold 3 Silver 3 Bronze 1 Total 7

Summer Olympics appearances (overview)
- 1900; 1904; 1908; 1912; 1920; 1924; 1928; 1932; 1936; 1948; 1952; 1956; 1960; 1964; 1968; 1972; 1976; 1980; 1984; 1988; 1992; 1996; 2000; 2004; 2008; 2012; 2016; 2020; 2024; 2028

Argentina competed at the 1928 Summer Olympics in Amsterdam, Netherlands, the nation's fifth appearance out of eight editions of the Summer Olympic Games. Argentina sent its second national team, under the auspices of the Argentine Olympic Committee (Comité Olímpico Argentino), 81 athletes (all males) that competed in 41 events in 12 sports. Argentina competed in equestrian, football, sailing, water polo, and wrestling for the first time. Argentina won 3 gold medals, its first Olympic championships in boxing (2 gold medals) and swimming. The team also won its first medals in fencing (a bronze) and football (a silver).

== Medalists ==
Medal	Name	Sport	Event	Date
Gold	Víctor Avendaño	Boxing	Men's light heavyweight	August 11
Gold	Arturo Rodríguez	Boxing	Men's heavyweight	August 11
Gold	Alberto Zorrilla	Swimming	Men's 400 m freestyle	August 9
Silver	Víctor Peralta	Boxing	Men's featherweight	August 11
Silver	Raúl Landini	Boxing	Men's welterweight	August 11
Silver	Argentina national football team: Ludovico Bidoglio; Ángel Bossio; Saúl Calandra; Alfredo Carricaberry; Roberto Cherro; Octavio Díaz; Juan Evaristo; Manuel Ferreira; Enrique Gainzarain; Alfredo Helman; Segundo Luna; Ángel Medici; Luis Monti; Pedro Ochoa; Rodolfo Orlandini; Raimundo Orsi; Fernando Paternoster; Feliciano Perducca; Natalio Perinetti; Domingo Tarasconi; Luis Weihmuller; Adolfo Zumelzú	Football		June 13
Bronze	Raúl Anganuzzi, Carmelo Camet, Roberto Larraz, Héctor Lucchetti, Luis Lucchetti	Fencing	Men's team foil	July 30

== Athletics ==
Five men competed for Argentina in athletics. It was the nation's second appearance in the sport. None of the athletes advanced to the final in any of their events; Kleger's 7th-place finish in the hammer throw was the country's best result in the sport.

Men

Track & road events

Athlete	Event	Heat		Quarterfinal		Semifinal		Final	
Athlete	Event	Result	Rank	Result	Rank	Result	Rank	Result	Rank
Eduardo Albe	100 m	Unknown	6	Did not advance					
Alberto Barucco	100 m	Unknown	3	Did not advance					
Juan Bautista Pina	100 m	11.0	1 Q	Unknown	2 Q	11.0	6	Did not advance	
Alberto Barucco	200 m	Unknown	2 Q	Unknown	3	Did not advance			
Juan Bautista Pina	200 m	Unknown	3	Did not advance					
Serafín Dengra	800 m	—N/a		2:01.2	1 Q	Unknown	7	Did not advance	
Leopoldo Ledesma	800 m	—N/a		Unknown	4	Did not advance			
Serafín Dengra	1500 m	—N/a				Unknown	5	Did not advance	
Leopoldo Ledesma	1500 m	—N/a				Unknown	5	Did not advance	
Valerio Vallania	110 m hurdles	—N/a		DQ	–	Did not advance			

Field events

Athlete	Event	Qualification		Final	
Athlete	Event	Distance	Position	Distance	Position
Valerio Vallania	High jump	1.77	19	Did not advance	
Federico Kleger	Hammer throw	46.61	7	Did not advance	

== Boxing ==
Eight men represented Argentina in boxing, the maximum allowed (one per weight class). It was the nation's third appearance in the sport. Avendaño and Rodríguez became the first Argentinian Olympic boxing champions.

Men

Athlete	Event	Round of 32	Round of 16	Quarterfinals	Semifinals	Final / Bronze match	
Athlete	Event	Opposition Result	Opposition Result	Opposition Result	Opposition Result	Opposition Result	Rank
Juan José Trillo	Flyweight	Bye	Taylor (GBR); L points	Did not advance			9
Carmelo Robledo	Bantamweight	Bye	Van Rumbeke (BEL); W points	Traynor (IRL); L points	Did not advance		5
Víctor Peralta	Featherweight	Bye	Olsen (NOR); W points	Boireau (FRA); W points	Biquet (BEL); W points	van Klaveren (NED); L points	2nd place, silver medalist(s)
Pascual Bonfiglio	Lightweight	Resko (FIN); W points	Dübbers (GER); W points	Halaiko (USA); L points	Did not advance		5
Raúl Landini	Welterweight	Lown (USA); W points	Palm (EST); W points	Blommers (NED); W points	Smillie (CAN); W points	Morgan (NZL); L points	2nd place, silver medalist(s)
Humberto Curi	Middleweight	Bye	Langlet (FRA); W points	Mallin (GBR); L points	Did not advance		5
Víctor Avendaño	Light heavyweight	—N/a	Ojeda (CHI); W points	Carrick (CAN); W points	McCorkindale (RSA); W points	Pistulla (GER); W points	1st place, gold medalist(s)
Arturo Rodríguez	Heavyweight	—N/a	Flanagan (IRL); W KO	Olij (NED); W points	Michaelsen (DEN); W points	Ramm (SWE); W KO	1st place, gold medalist(s)

Opponent nation	Wins	Losses	Percent
Belgium	2	0	1.000
Canada	2	0	1.000
Chile	1	0	1.000
Denmark	1	0	1.000
Estonia	1	0	1.000
Finland	1	0	1.000
France	2	0	1.000
Germany	2	0	1.000
Great Britain	0	2	.000
Ireland	1	1	.500
Netherlands	2	1	.667
New Zealand	0	1	.000
Norway	1	0	1.000
South Africa	1	0	1.000
Sweden	1	0	1.000
United States	1	1	.500
Total	19	6	.760

Round	Wins	Losses	Percent
Round of 32	2	0	1.000
Round of 16	7	1	.875
Quarterfinals	4	3	.571
Semifinals	4	0	1.000
Final	2	2	.500
Bronze match	0	0	–
Total	19	6	.760

== Cycling ==
Six cyclists, all men, represented Argentina in 1928. It was the nation's second appearance in the sport.

=== Road ===
Men

Athlete	Event	Time	Rank
Francisco Bonvehi	Road race	5:14:39	20
Luis de Meyer	Road race	5:28:48	41
José López	Road race	5:14:57	21
Cosme Saavedra	Road race	5:13:19	15
Francisco Bonvehi; José López; Cosme Saavedra	Team road race	15:42:55	8

=== Track ===
Time trial

Athlete	Event	Time	Rank
Francisco Rodríguez	Time trial	1:18.4	8

Sprint

Athlete	Event	1st Round	Repechage 1	Repechage Final	Quarterfinals	Semifinals	Final
Athlete	Event	Rank	Rank	Rank	Rank	Rank	Rank
Antonio Malvassi	Sprint	2 r	1 R	2 Q	2	Did not advance	

== Equestrian ==
Three horse and rider pairs competed for Argentina in equestrian events in 1928, all in the jumping competition. It was the nation's debut appearance in the sport. Del Villar was the best finisher for Argentina, at 34th place in the individual jumping. The sum of the individual scores was used for the team result; Argentina came in 12th among the 14 teams.

Jumping

Athlete	Horse	Event	Final			1st re-ride		2nd re-ride	
Athlete	Horse	Event	Time	Penalties	Rank	Penalties	Rank	Penalties	Rank
Raúl Antoli	Turbion	Individual	1:45	20	40	Did not advance			
Amabrio del Villar	Talán-Talán	Individual	1:49	12 1/4	34	Did not advance			
Víctor Fernández	Silencio	Individual	1:27	26	42	Did not advance			
Raúl Antoli; Amabrio del Villar; Víctor Fernández	Turbion; Talán-Talán; Silencio	Team	–	58 1/4	12	—N/a			

== Fencing ==
Nine fencers, all men, represented Argentina in 1928. It was the nation's third appearance in the sport. They won the bronze medal in the team foil event, Argentina's first Olympic fencing medal.

Fencer	Event	Round 1		Quarterfinals		Semifinals		Final	
Fencer	Event	Result	Rank	Result	Rank	Result	Rank	Result	Rank
José Llauro	Épée	1 win	10	Did not advance					
Oscar Martínez	Épée	5 wins	5 Q	2 wins	10	Did not advance			
Antonio Villamil	Épée	4 wins	7	Did not advance					
Oscar Viñas	Foil	—N/a		5 wins	2 Q	1 win	8	Did not advance	
Raúl Anganuzzi; Carmelo Camet; Roberto Larraz; Héctor Lucchetti; Luis Lucchetti	Team foil	3–0	1 Q	1–1	2 Q	1–0	1 Q	1–2	3rd place, bronze medalist(s)

== Football ==
Argentina's Olympic football debut resulted in a silver medal.

Summary

Team	Event	Prelim.	Round of 16	Quarterfinals	Semifinals	Final / BM	
Team	Event	Opposition Score	Opposition Score	Opposition Score	Opposition Score	Opposition Score	Rank
Argentina men's U-23	Men's tournament	Bye	United States; W 11–2	Belgium; W 6–3	Egypt; W 6–0	Uruguay; D 1–1; L 2–1	2nd place, silver medalist(s)

Men's tournament

Team roster

Head coach: (Spain) José Lago Millán

No.	Pos.	Player	Date of birth (age)	Caps	Club
2	DF	Ludovico Bidoglio	5 February 1900 (aged 28)		(Argentina) Boca Juniors
1	GK	Ángel Bossio	5 May 1905 (aged 23)		(Argentina) Talleres (BA)
5	MF	Saúl Calandra	22 October 1904 (aged 23)		(Argentina) Estudiantes (LP)
8	FW	Alfredo Carricaberry	8 October 1900 (aged 27)		(Argentina) San Lorenzo
10	MF	Roberto Cherro	23 February 1907 (aged 21)		(Argentina) Boca Juniors
12	GK	Octavio Díaz	7 October 1900 (aged 27)		(Argentina) Rosario Central
14	DF	Juan Evaristo	20 June 1902 (aged 25)		(Argentina) Sp. Palermo
9	FW	Manuel Ferreira	22 October 1905 (aged 22)		(Argentina) Estudiantes (LP)
15	FW	Enrique Gainzarain	7 December 1904 (aged 23)		(Argentina) Ferro Carril Oeste
19	DF	Alberto Helman			(Argentina) Estudiantes (SdE)
17	MF	Segundo Luna	20 April 1902 (aged 26)		(Argentina) Club Atlético Mitre
4	DF	Ángel Médici	20 December 1897 (aged 30)		(Argentina) Boca Juniors
6	MF	Luis Monti	15 May 1901 (aged 27)		(Argentina) San Lorenzo
18	MF	Pedro Ochoa	22 February 1900 (aged 28)		(Argentina) Racing
13	DF	Rodolfo Orlandini	1 January 1905 (aged 23)		(Argentina) Sp. Buenos Aires
11	FW	Raimundo Orsi	2 December 1901 (aged 26)		(Argentina) Independiente
3	DF	Fernando Paternoster	24 May 1903 (aged 25)		(Argentina) Racing
20	FW	Feliciano Perducca	9 June 1901 (aged 26)		(Argentina) Boca Alumni
22	FW	Natalio Perinetti	28 December 1900 (aged 27)		(Argentina) Racing
7	FW	Domingo Tarasconi	20 December 1903 (aged 24)		(Argentina) Boca Juniors
16	DF	Luis Weihmuller	2 August 1902 (aged 25)		(Argentina) Sp. Palermo
21	DF	Adolfo Zumelzú	5 January 1902 (aged 26)		(Argentina) Sp. Palermo

Round of 16

29 May 1928
19:00

Argentina	11–2	United States
Ferreira 9', 29'; Tarasconi 24', 63', 66', 89'; Orsi 41', 73'; Cherro 47', 49', 57'	Report	Kuntner 55'; Caroll 75'

Olympic Stadium, Amsterdam
Attendance: 3,848
Referee: Paul Ruoff (SUI)

Quarterfinals

2 June 1928
16:00

Argentina	6–3	Belgium
Tarasconi 1', 10', 75', 89'; Ferreira 4'; Orsi 81'	Report	R. Braine 24'; Vanhalme 28'; Moeschal 53'

Olympic Stadium, Amsterdam
Attendance: 16,399
Referee: Gamma Malcher (ITA)

Semifinals

6 June 1928
19:00

Argentina	6–0	Egypt
Cherro 10'; Ferreira 32', 82'; Tarasconi 37', 54', 61'	Report

Olympic Stadium, Amsterdam
Attendance: 7,887
Referee: Pedro Escartín (ESP)

Gold medal match

10 June 1928
16:00
Final

Uruguay	1–1 (a.e.t.)	Argentina
Petrone 23'	Report	Ferreira 50'

Olympic Stadium, Amsterdam
Attendance: 28,253
Referee: Johannes Mutters (NED)

13 June 1928
19:00
Rematch

Uruguay	2–1	Argentina
Figueroa 17'; Scarone 73'	Report	Monti 28'

Olympic Stadium, Amsterdam
Attendance: 28,113
Referee: Johannes Mutters (Netherlands)

Team details

Uruguay	Argentina

GK	Andres Mazali
RB	José Nasazzi (c)
LB	Pedro Arispe
RH	José Andrade
CH	Juan Píriz
LH	Álvaro Gestido
OR	Juan Arremón
IR	Héctor Scarone
CF	René Borjas
IL	Pedro Cea
OL	Roberto Figueroa
Manager:
(Uruguay) Primo Gianotti

GK	Ángel Bossio
RB	Ludovico Bidoglio
LB	Fernando Paternoster
RH	Segundo Médici
CH	Luis Monti
LH	Juan Evaristo
OR	Alfredo Carricaberry
IR	Domingo Tarasconi
CF	Manuel Ferreira
IL	Feliciano Perducca
OL	Raimundo Orsi
Manager:
(Spain) José Lago Millán

Linesmen:
Ulises Saucedo (Bolivia)
Henri Christophe (Belgium)

== Rowing ==
Nine men (an eights boat with coxswain) represented Argentina in rowing. It was the nation's second appearance in the sport. The Argentinian boat effectively placed 7th, not advancing to the third round.

Men

Athlete	Event	Round 1		Repechage 1		Round 2		Repechage 2		Round 3		Semifinals		Final	
Athlete	Event	Time	Rank	Time	Rank	Time	Rank	Time	Rank	Time	Rank	Time	Rank	Time	Rank
Ernesto Black; Irving Bond; Pedro Brise; Lázaro Iturrieta; Gustavo Lanusse; Armin Meyer; Federico Probst; Leonel Sutton; Alberto Errecalde (cox)	Eights	7:10.0	1 Q	Bye		6:53.4	2 R	6:33.0	2	Did not advance					

== Sailing ==
Five sailors represented Argentina in 1928. It was the nation's debut in the sport.

Sailor	Event	Final							
Sailor	Event	Race 1	Race 2	Race 3	Race 4	Race 5	Race 6	Race 7	Rank
Rafael Iglesias; Miguel Bosch; Pedro Dates; Horacio Seeber; Carlos Serantes	8 metre class	5	8	4	8	Did not advance			8

== Swimming ==
Four men represented Argentina in swimming in 1928. It was the nation's second appearance in the sport. Alberto Zorrilla competed in all three freestyle races, advancing to the final in each and taking gold in the middle distance. It was Argentina's first medal in swimming.

Men

Athlete	Event	Heat		Semifinal		Final	
Athlete	Event	Time	Rank	Time	Rank	Time	Rank
Francisco Uranga	100 m freestyle	1:05.6	2 Q	Unknown	4	Did not advance	
Alberto Zorrilla	100 m freestyle	1:01.8	1 Q	1:01.6	2 Q	1:01.6	7
Alberto Zorrilla	400 m freestyle	5:19.2	1 Q	5:11.4	1 Q	5:01.6 OR	1st place, gold medalist(s)
Alberto Zorrilla	1500 m freestyle	22:21.2	1 Q	21:17.0	2 Q	21:23.8	5
Amilcar Álvarez; Francisco Uranga; Emilio Vives; Alberto Zorrilla	4 × 200 m freestyle relay	—N/a		Unknown	4	Did not advance	

== Water polo ==
Argentina competed in Olympic water polo for the first time. They were defeated by Hungary 14–0 in the first round.

Summary

Key:
- FT – After full time.
- P – Match decided by penalty-shootout.

Team	Event	Round of 16	Quarterfinal	Semifinal	Final / BM	
Team	Event	Opposition Score	Opposition Score	Opposition Score	Opposition Score	Rank
Argentina men's	Men's tournament	Hungary; L 0–14	Did not advance			9

=== Men's tournament ===
Team roster

Head coach:

No.	Pos.	Player	DoB	Age	Caps	Club	Tournament games	Tournament goals
		Mario Bistoletti			?		2	0
	GK	Ricardo Bustamante			?		2	0
		Carlos Castro			?		2	0
		Jorge Moreau	1908		?		2	0
		Luciano Rovere			?		2	0
		S. Stipanicic			?		2	0
		Francisco Uranga			?		2	0
		César Vásquez			?		2	0

Round of 16

4 August 1928	OR p. 808	Hungary	14–0	Argentina	Amsterdam; Referees: C. Minnes Jr. (NED)
4 August 1928	OR p. 808	Scoring by half: 9–0, 5–0			Amsterdam; Referees: C. Minnes Jr. (NED)

== Weightlifting ==
Two men represented Argentina in weightlifting in 1928. It was the nation's second appearance in the sport.

Athlete	Event	Press		Snatch		Clean & Jerk		Total	Rank
Athlete	Event	Result	Rank	Result	Rank	Result	Rank	Total	Rank
Casimiro Vega	Men's −60 kg	60	20	67.5	20	95	19	222.5	21
Alfredo Pianta	Men's −75 kg	75	19	90	10	120	6	285	9

== Wrestling ==
Five men represented Argentina in wrestling in 1928. It was the nation's debut in the sport. Rey was the only Argentine wrestler to win a bout, though Walzer's bye in the second round of the middleweight competition actually gave the latter man a slightly better ranking than Rey.

Men's Greco-Roman

Athlete	Event	Round 1	Round 2	Round 3	Round 4	Round 5	Round 6	Round 7	Rank
Athlete	Event	Opposition Result	Opposition Result	Opposition Result	Opposition Result	Opposition Result	Opposition Result	Opposition Result	Rank
Eduardo Bosc	−58 kg	Lindelöf (SWE); L Fall 3pts	Leucht (GER); L Fall 6pts	Did not advance				—N/a	14
Ricardo Rey	−62 kg	Bieri (SUI); W Fall 0pts	Steinig (GER); L Fall 3pts	Meyer (DEN); L Fall 6pts	Did not advance				10
Alberto Barbieri	−67.5 kg	Westerlund (FIN); L Fall 3pts	Błażyca (POL); L Fall 6pts	Did not advance					13
Antonio Walzer	−75 kg	Frei (SUI); L Decision 3pts	Bye	Kokkinen (FIN); L Fall 6pts	Did not advance			—N/a	9
Jorge Briola	+82.5 kg	Çoban (TUR); L Decision 3pts	Zvejnieks (LAT); L Fall 6pts	Did not advance				—N/a	11
