= New Zealand at the 1928 Summer Olympics =

- IOC code: NZL
- NOC: Olympic Council of New Zealand
- Website: www.olympic.org.nz

in Amsterdam
- Competitors: 10 in 3 sports
- Flag bearer: Arthur Porritt
- Medals Ranked 24th: Gold 1 Silver 0 Bronze 0 Total 1

Summer Olympics appearances (overview)
- 1908; 1912; 1920; 1924; 1928; 1932; 1936; 1948; 1952; 1956; 1960; 1964; 1968; 1972; 1976; 1980; 1984; 1988; 1992; 1996; 2000; 2004; 2008; 2012; 2016; 2020; 2024; 2028

Other related appearances
- Australasia (1908–1912)

New Zealand competed at the 1928 Summer Olympics in Amsterdam, Netherlands with a team of ten competitors: four athletes, four swimmers and two boxers. Seven men and three women represented their country, accompanied by four others. The athletes were led by Arthur Porritt, who was the only New Zealand competitor who had attended the previous Summer Olympics in 1924; Porritt would four decades later become New Zealand's 11th Governor-General. The team won one medal; boxer Ted Morgan won gold in the men's welterweight. Excluding Malcolm Champion's gold as part of a combined Australasia team in 1912, this was New Zealand's first Olympic gold medal.

== Medallists ==
Medal	Name	Sport	Event	Date
Gold	Ted Morgan	Boxing	Men's welterweight	11 August

== Delegation ==
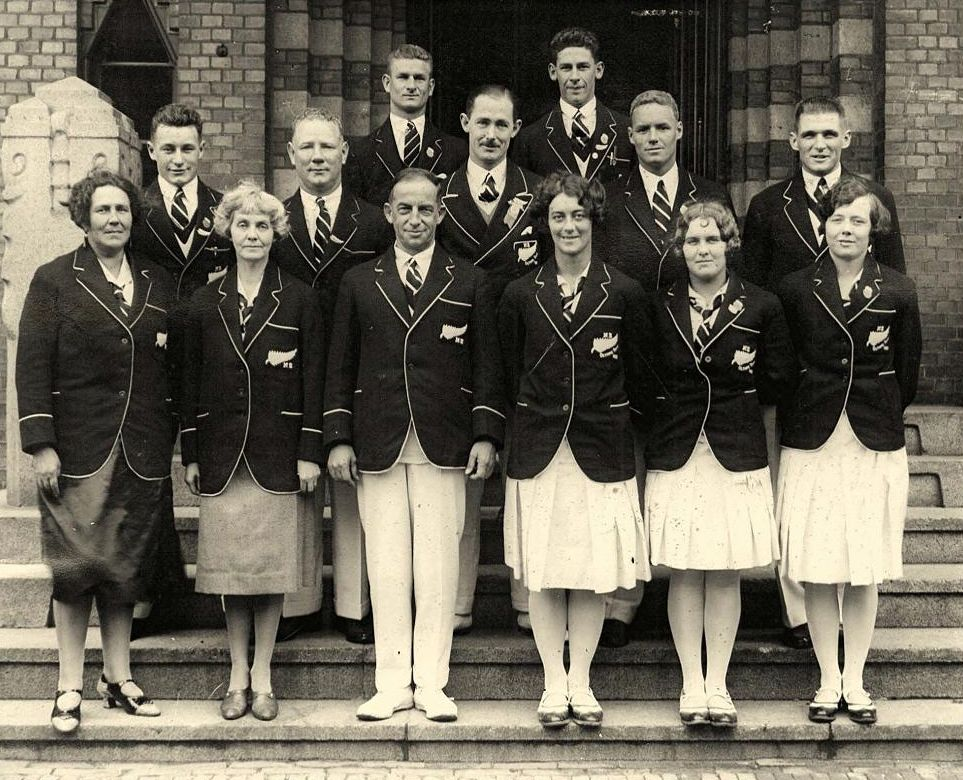
The New Zealand team in 1928 including supporters; front (l–r): Annie Miller (chaperone), Mrs Amos (chaperone), Harry Amos (Chef de Mission), Ena Stockley, Kathleen Miller, Norma Wilson middle: Ted Morgan, C. Dickinson (masseur), Arthur Porritt, David Lindsay, Alf Cleverley back: Len Moorhouse, Stan Lay

Arthur Porritt was appointed captain by the New Zealand Olympic Council. Porritt was at the time based in England for tertiary study and was thus in a position to arrange some things in Europe. He also had the advantage that he had attended the previous Summer Olympics, winning the country's only medal. Porritt, a runner, was joined by eight other competitors: four swimmers, three track and field athletes, and two boxers. In total, there were seven men and three women competing for New Zealand. Both the boxer Alf Cleverley and the swimmer Len Moorhouse did not receive financial support by the Olympic Council for their journey to the Games, but had to pay for it themselves. All athletes apart from Porritt (who was already in England) and Moorhouse travelled by the Remuera to England; The main body of the team was farewelled in Wellington by the prime minister, Gordon Coates, and several cabinet ministers.

Moorhouse followed over a month later on the Tamaroa. A New Zealand rowing eight (including the future All Black Hubert McLean) was selected but was unable to travel to the games because of lack of funds.

Harry Amos was appointed Chef de Mission; at the time he was referred to as chairman. His wife acted as chaperon and travelled to the Olympics at their own expense. A masseur from Wellington, C. Dickinson, accompanied the team in an honorary capacity. Swimmer Kathleen Miller, 19 years old at the time, was accompanied by her mother Annie Miller as a chaperone. Therefore, the ten athletes were accompanied by four others to the Olympics.

== Athletics ==
Key

- Note–Ranks given for track events are within the athlete's heat only
- Q = Qualified for the next round
- q = Qualified for the next round as a fastest loser or, in field events, by position without achieving the qualifying target
- NR = National record
- N/A = Round not applicable for the event
- Bye = Athlete not required to compete in round
- NP = Not placed

Men
Track & road events

Athlete	Event	Heat		Semifinal		Final	
Athlete	Event	Result	Rank	Result	Rank	Result	Rank
Wilfrid Kalaugher	110 m hurdles	Unknown	4	did not advance			

Men
Field events

Athlete	Event	Qualification		Final	
Athlete	Event	Distance	Position	Distance	Position
Wilfrid Kalaugher	Triple Jump	12.94	23	did not advance	
Stan Lay	Javelin	62.89	7	did not advance	

Women
Track & road events

Athlete	Event	Heat		Semifinal		Final	
Athlete	Event	Result	Rank	Result	Rank	Result	Rank
Norma Wilson	100 m	11.30	2 Q	Unknown	5	did not advance	

== Boxing ==
Name	Event	Round of 32	Round of 16	Quarterfinals	Semifinals	Final	Rank
Name	Event	Opposition Result	Opposition Result	Opposition Result	Opposition Result	Opposition Result	
Ted Morgan	Welterweight	Bye	Johansson (SWE); W KO2	Caneva (ITA); W Points	Galataud (FRA); W Points	Landini (ARG); W Points	1st place, gold medalist(s)
Alf Cleverley	Light heavyweight	—N/a	Jackson (GBR); L Points	did not advance			9T

== Swimming ==
Men

Ranks given are within the heat.

Swimmer	Event	Heats		Semifinals		Final	
Swimmer	Event	Result	Rank	Result	Rank	Result	Rank
David Lindsay	400 m freestyle	5:38.6	3	did not advance			
David Lindsay	1500 m freestyle	Unknown	4	did not advance			
Len Moorhouse	100 m backstroke	1:20.4	3	did not advance			

Women

Ranks given are within the heat.

Swimmer	Event	Heats		Semifinals		Final	
Swimmer	Event	Result	Rank	Result	Rank	Result	Rank
Ena Stockley	100 m backstroke	1:25.4	3 q	n/a		1:24.4	7
Ena Stockley	100 m freestyle	1:16.4	2 Q	Unknown	5	did not advance	
Kathleen Miller	100 m freestyle	1:17.2	2 Q	Unknown	6	did not advance	
Kathleen Miller	400 m freestyle	6:16.8	2 Q	Unknown	5	did not advance	
