= Boxing at the 1928 Summer Olympics – Welterweight =

Boxing competitions

Men's welterweight boxing at the Games of the IX Olympiad
- Venue: Krachtsportgebouw
- Date: August 7–11, 1928
- Competitors: 22 from 22 nations

Medalists
1st place, gold medalist(s)		Ted Morgan	New Zealand
2nd place, silver medalist(s)		Raúl Landini	Argentina
3rd place, bronze medalist(s)		Raymond Smillie	Canada

The men's welterweight event was part of the boxing programme at the 1928 Summer Olympics. The weight class was the fourth-heaviest contested, and allowed boxers of up to 147 pounds (66.7 kilograms). The competition was held from August 7, 1928 to August 11, 1928.

== Results ==
Round of 32; August 7
Valter Palm (EST)	PTS
Albert Nuss (LUX)	L
Raúl Landini (ARG)	PTS
Thomas Lown (USA)	L
Kintaro Usuda (JPN)	PTS
Dionisio Fernández (ESP)	L
Leonard Hall (RHO)	PTS
William Walther (GER)	L
Raymond Smillie (CAN)	PTS
Johann Fraberger (AUT)	L
Patrick Lenehan (IRL)	PTS
Arne Sande (DEN)	L

Round of 16; August 8
Romano Caneva (ITA)	PTS
Harry Dunn (GBR)	L
Ted Morgan (NZL)	W
Selfrid Johansson (SWE)	KO2
Robert Galataud (FRA)	PTS
František Nekolný (TCH)	L
Johan Hellström (FIN)	PTS
Fred Ellis (RSA)	L
Cor Blommers (NED)	PTS
Adrien Anneet (BEL)	L
Valter Palm (EST)	L
Raúl Landini (ARG)	PTS
Kintaro Usuda (JPN)	PTS
Leonard Hall (RHO)	L
Raymond Smillie (CAN)	PTS
Patrick Lenehan (IRL)	L

Quarterfinals; August 9
Romano Caneva (ITA)	L
Ted Morgan (NZL)	PTS
Robert Galataud (FRA)	PTS
Johan Hellström (FIN)	L
Cor Blommers (NED)	L
Raúl Landini (ARG)	PTS
Kintaro Usuda (JPN)	L
Raymond Smillie (CAN)	PTS

Semifinals; August 10
Ted Morgan (NZL)	PTS
Robert Galataud (FRA)	L
Raúl Landini (ARG)	PTS
Raymond Smillie (CAN)	L

Final; August 11
Ted Morgan (NZL)	PTS
Raúl Landini (ARG)	L
Bronze medal bout
Raymond Smillie (CAN)	PTS
Robert Galataud (FRA)	L
