= Boxing at the 1928 Summer Olympics =

Coordinates: 52.3444°N 4.8560°E

Boxing at the Games of the IX Olympiad
- Dates: 7-12 August 1928
- Competitors: 144 from 29 nations

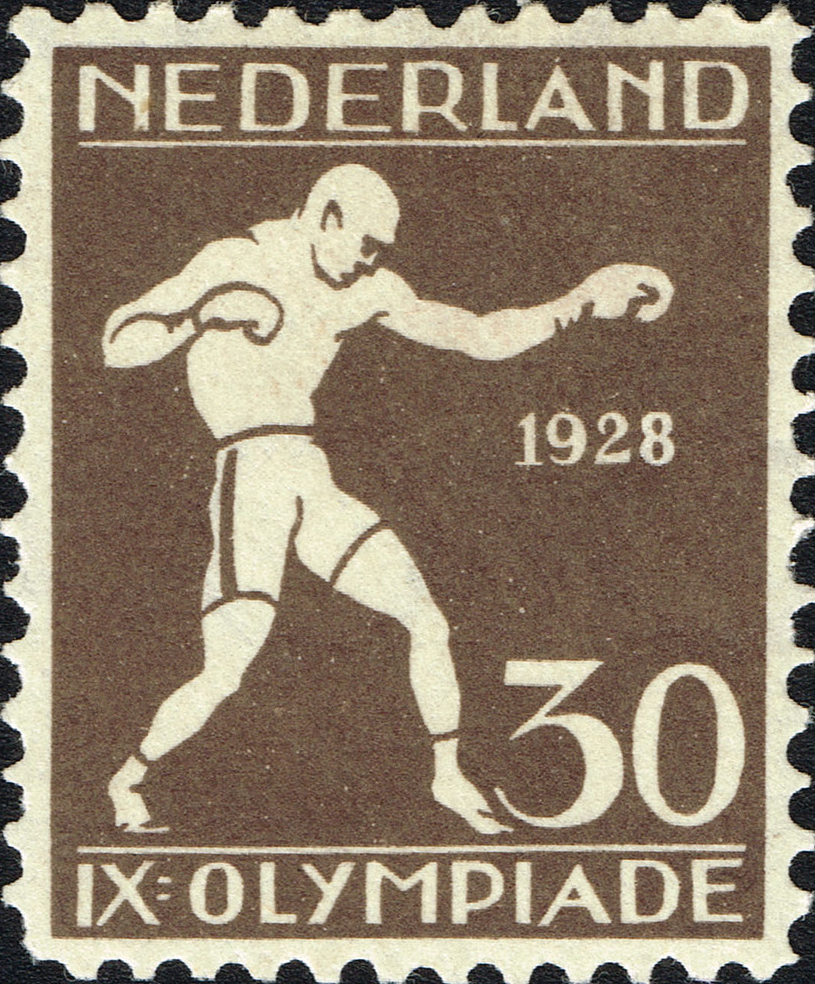
Boxing at the 1928 Summer Olympics on a stamp of the Netherlands

These are the results of the boxing competition at the 1928 Summer Olympics in Amsterdam. Medals were awarded in eight weight classes. The competitions were held from 7 to 12 August.

== Participating nations ==
A total of 144 boxers from 29 nations competed at the Amsterdam Games:

- Argentina (8)
- Austria (1)
- Belgium (6)
- Canada (7)
- Chile (4)
- Czechoslovakia (3)
- Denmark (6)
- Estonia (1)
- Finland (3)
- France (8)
- Germany (8)
- Great Britain (8)
- Greece (2)
- Hungary (4)
- Ireland (8)
- Italy (7)
- Japan (2)
- Lithuania (2)
- Luxembourg (5)
- Mexico (4)
- Netherlands (6)
- New Zealand (2)
- Norway (5)
- Poland (4)
- Rhodesia (2)
- South Africa (6)
- Spain (6)
- Sweden (8)
- United States (8)

== Medal summary ==
Games	Gold	Silver	Bronze
Flyweight (−50.8 kg / 112 lb)	Antal Kocsis; Hungary	Armand Apell; France	Carlo Cavagnoli; Italy
Bantamweight (−53.5 kg / 118 lb)	Vittorio Tamagnini; Italy	John Daley; United States	Harry Isaacs; South Africa
Featherweight (−57.2 kg / 126 lb)	Bep van Klaveren; Netherlands	Víctor Peralta; Argentina	Harold Devine; United States
Lightweight (−61.2 kg / 135 lb)	Carlo Orlandi; Italy	Stephen Halaiko; United States	Gunnar Berggren; Sweden
Welterweight (−66.7 kg / 147 lb)	Ted Morgan; New Zealand	Raúl Landini; Argentina	Raymond Smillie; Canada
Middleweight (−72.6 kg / 160 lb)	Piero Toscani; Italy	Jan Heřmánek; Czechoslovakia	Léonard Steyaert; Belgium
Light heavyweight (−79.4 kg / 175 lb)	Víctor Avendaño; Argentina	Ernst Pistulla; Germany	Karel Miljon; Netherlands
Heavyweight (over 79.4 kg/175 lb)	Arturo Rodríguez Jurado; Argentina	Nils Ramm; Sweden	Michael Michaelsen; Denmark

== Medal table ==
Rank	Nation	Gold	Silver	Bronze	Total
1	Italy	3	0	1	4
2	Argentina	2	2	0	4
3	Netherlands	1	0	1	2
4	Hungary	1	0	0	1
4	New Zealand	1	0	0	1
6	United States	0	2	1	3
7	Sweden	0	1	1	2
8	Czechoslovakia	0	1	0	1
8	France	0	1	0	1
8	Germany	0	1	0	1
11	Belgium	0	0	1	1
11	Canada	0	0	1	1
11	Denmark	0	0	1	1
11	South Africa	0	0	1	1
Totals (14 entries)		8	8	8	24
