= Boxing at the 1928 Summer Olympics – Heavyweight =

Boxing competitions

Men's heavyweight boxing at the Games of the IX Olympiad
- Venue: Krachtsportgebouw
- Date: August 8–11, 1928
- Competitors: 10 from 10 nations

Medalists
| 1st place, gold medalist(s) | | Arturo Rodríguez | Argentina |
| 2nd place, silver medalist(s) | | Nils Ramm | Sweden |
| 3rd place, bronze medalist(s) | | Michael Michaelsen | Denmark |

The men's heavyweight event was part of the boxing programme at the 1928 Summer Olympics. The weight class was the heaviest contested, allowing boxers weighing over 175 pounds (79.4 kilograms). The competition was held from Wednesday, August 8, 1928 to Saturday, August 11, 1928.

== Results ==
Round of 16; August 8
Arturo Rodríguez (ARG) | W
Matt Flanagan (IRL) | KO1
Sam Olij (NED) | PTS
Joe Goyder (GBR) | L

Quarterfinals; August 9
Sverre Sørsdal (NOR) | W
Alexander Kaletchitz (USA) | KO1
Nils Ramm (SWE) | PTS
Hans Schönrath (GER) | L
Michael Michaelsen (DEN) | PTS
Georges Gardebois (FRA) | L
Arturo Rodríguez (ARG) | PTS
Sam Olij (NED) | L

Semifinals; August 10
Sverre Sørsdal (NOR) | L
Nils Ramm (SWE) | PTS
Michael Michaelsen (DEN) | L
Arturo Rodríguez (ARG) | PTS

Final; August 11
Arturo Rodríguez (ARG) | W
Nils Ramm (SWE) | KO1
Bronze medal bout
Michael Michaelsen (DEN) | W
Sverre Sørsdal (NOR) | w/o
