= Fred Ellis (boxer) =

South African boxer

Personal information
- Nationality: South African
- Born: 22 July 1907
- Died: 31 December 1963 (aged 56); Cape Town, South Africa

Sport
- Sport: Boxing

Fred Ellis (22 July 1907 – 31 December 1963) was a South African boxer. He competed in the men's welterweight event at the 1928 Summer Olympics. He lost in first fight of the tournament to Johan Hellström of Finland.
