= Víctor Fernández (disambiguation) =

Víctor Fernández (born 1960) is a Spanish football coach.

Víctor Fernández may also refer to:

- Vic Fernandez (1939–2020), Argentine footballer and manager
- Víctor Fernández (footballer, born 1987), Spanish footballer
- Víctor Fernández (equestrian), Argentine Olympic equestrian
- Víctor Fernández Manero (1898–1976), Mexican politician, governor of Tabasco in 1936–1938
- Víctor Manuel Fernández (born 1962), Argentine cardinal and theologian
- Víctor Manuel Fernández Gutiérrez (born 1974), simply known as Víctor, Spanish football manager and former footballer
- Victor Fernández (footballer, born 1998), Spanish footballer
- Víctor Fernández (footballer, born 2007), Spanish footballer
