= František Nekolný =

Czechoslovak boxer

František "Franta" Nekolný (November 26, 1907 – October 4, 1990) was a Czech boxer who competed for Czechoslovakia in the 1928 Summer Olympics.

In 1928 he was eliminated in the second round of the welterweight class after losing his fight to Robert Galataud.
