= Alexander Kaletchitz =

American boxer

Alexander Joseph Kaletchitz (March 2, 1898 – April 1, 1994) was an American boxer who competed in the 1928 Summer Olympics.

He was born in New York City and died in Palmetto, Florida.

In 1928 he was eliminated in the quarter-finals of the heavyweight class after losing his bout to Sverre Sørsdal.

== 1928 Olympic results ==
Below is the record of Alexander Kaletchitz, an American heavyweight boxer who competed at the 1928 Amsterdam Olympics:

- Round of 16: bye
- Quarterfinal: lost to Sverre Sørsdal (Norway) by first-round knockout
