= Dionisio Fernández =

Dionisio Fernández can refer to:

- Dionisio Fernández (boxer), Spanish boxer
- Dionisio Fernández (sport shooter), Argentine sport shooter
