= Adrien Anneet =

Belgian boxer

Adrien Anneet (15 November 1908 – ?) was a Belgian boxer who competed in the 1928 Summer Olympics. He was born in Brussels.

In 1928 he was eliminated in the second round of the welterweight class after losing his fight to Cor Blommers.
