= Valter Palm =

Estonian boxer

Walter Palm
- Born: Valter Palm; 23 December 1905; Mahtra, Russian Empire
- Died: 3 November 1994 (aged 88); New York, NY
- Nationality: Estonia
- Weight: 69.0 kg (152.1 lb; 10.87 st)
- Stance: Orthodox
- Fighting out of: New York, New York
- Years active: 8 years (1924–1932)

Professional boxing record
- Total: 23
- Wins: 19
- By knockout: 9
- Losses: 2
- By knockout: 1
- Draws: 2

Other information
- Boxing record from BoxRec
- Last updated on: 17 September 2009

Valter Palm (alias Walter Palm) (23 December 1905 – 3 November 1994) was an Estonian welterweight professional boxer, born in Mahtra, who competed in the 1930s. In the 1920s he took part 1924 Summer Olympics and 1928 Summer Olympics.

== 1924 Summer Olympics ==
Welterweight (- 66,7 kg).

- First round – lost to Héctor Méndez (Argentina) (→ did not advance, 17-29th place)

== 1928 Summer Olympics ==
Welterweight (- 66,7 kg).

- First round – defeated Albert Nuss (Luxembourg) with points.
- Second round – lost to Raúl Landini (Argentina) with points. (→ did not advance, 9-16th place)
