= Matt Flanagan =

Matt Flanagan may refer to:

- Matt Flanagan (boxer)
- Matt Flanagan (American football)
