= Hans Schönrath =

German boxer

Medal record

Men's amateur boxing

Representing Germany

European Amateur Championships
Silver medal – second place	1927 Berlin	Heavyweight

Hans Schönrath (8 November 1902 – 10 February 1945) was a German boxer who competed in the 1928 Summer Olympics.

He was born in Gronau and died near Pillau. He was drowned when the hospital ship SS General von Steuben sunk during World War II.

In 1928 he was eliminated in the quarter-finals of the heavyweight class after losing his fight to the upcoming silver medalist Nils Ramm.

He appeared in the 1935 boxing film Knockout playing the role of the British champion.

== 1928 Olympic results ==
Below if the record of Hans Schönrath, a German heavyweight boxer who competed at the 1928 Amsterdam Olympics:

- Round of 16: bye:
- Quarterfinal: lost to Nils Ramm (Sweden) by decision
