= Johann Fraberger =

Austrian boxer

Personal information
- Nickname: Hans
- Nationality: Austrian
- Born: March 23, 1905
- Died: 1948

Boxing career

Johann "Hans" Fraberger (March 23, 1905 – 1948) was an Austrian boxer who competed in the 1928 Summer Olympics.

He was born in Vienna.

In 1928 he was eliminated in the first round of the welterweight class after losing his fight to the upcoming bronze medalist Raymond Smillie.
