= Cycling at the 1928 Summer Olympics – Men's team time trial =

Men's cycling team time trial at the Games of the IX Olympiad
- Venue: Amsterdam
- Competitors: 45 from 15 nations
- Winning time: 15:09:14

Medalists
1st place, gold medalist(s)		Henry Hansen, Leo Nielsen, Orla Jørgensen	Denmark
2nd place, silver medalist(s)		Jack Lauterwasser, John Middleton, Frank Southall	Great Britain
3rd place, bronze medalist(s)		Gösta Carlsson, Erik Jansson, Georg Johnsson	Sweden

The men's team time trial, a part of the cycling events at the 1928 Summer Olympics, took place in Amsterdam. The team event was simply an aggregation of results from the individual time trial event, with the best three times for each nation being added to give a team score.

== Final classification ==
Source: Official results

Rank	Team	Riders	Time	Total
1st place, gold medalist(s)	Denmark	Henry Hansen (DEN)	4:47:18	15:09:14
1st place, gold medalist(s)	Denmark	Leo Nielsen (DEN)	5:05:37	15:09:14
1st place, gold medalist(s)	Denmark	Orla Jørgensen (DEN)	5:16:19	15:09:14
2nd place, silver medalist(s)	Great Britain	Frank Southall (GBR)	4:55:06	15:14:49
2nd place, silver medalist(s)	Great Britain	Jack Lauterwasser (GBR)	5:02:57	15:14:49
2nd place, silver medalist(s)	Great Britain	John Middleton (GBR)	5:16:46	15:14:49
3rd place, bronze medalist(s)	Sweden	Gösta Carlsson (SWE)	5:00:17	15:27:49
3rd place, bronze medalist(s)	Sweden	Erik Jansson (SWE)	5:13:17	15:27:49
3rd place, bronze medalist(s)	Sweden	Georg Johnsson (SWE)	5:14:15	15:27:49
4	Italy	Allegro Grandi (ITA)	5:02:05	15:33:12
4	Italy	Michele Orecchia (ITA)	5:13:29	15:33:12
4	Italy	Ambrogio Beretta (ITA)	5:17:38	15:33:12
5	Belgium	Jean Aerts (BEL)	5:10:38	15:33:50
5	Belgium	Pierre Houdé (BEL)	5:11:18	15:33:50
5	Belgium	Joseph Lowagie (BEL)	5:11:54	15:33:50
6	Switzerland	Gottlieb Amstein (SUI)	5:04:48	15:35:21
6	Switzerland	Jakob Caironi (SUI)	5:08:46	15:35:21
6	Switzerland	Gottlieb Wanzenried (SUI)	5:21:47	15:35:21
7	France	André Aumerle (FRA)	5:07:12	15:38:20
7	France	Louis Bessière (FRA)	5:15:14	15:38:20
7	France	Octave Dayen (FRA)	5:15:54	15:38:20
8	Argentina	Cosme Saavedra (ARG)	5:13:19	15:42:55
8	Argentina	Francisco Bonvehi (ARG)	5:14:39	15:42:55
8	Argentina	José López (ARG)	5:14:57	15:42:55
9	Netherlands	Leendert Buis (NED)	5:14:15	15:54:44
9	Netherlands	Janus Braspennincx (NED)	5:17:07	15:54:44
9	Netherlands	Ben Duijker (NED)	5:23:22	15:54:44
10	Luxembourg	Jean-Pierre Muller (LUX)	5:22:30	16:20:55
10	Luxembourg	Norbert Sinner (LUX)	5:27:54	16:20:55
10	Luxembourg	Jean Alfonsetti (LUX)	5:30:31	16:20:55
11	Czechoslovakia	Antonín Honig (TCH)	5:27:45	16:36:45
11	Czechoslovakia	Antonín Perič (TCH)	5:34:30	16:36:45
11	Czechoslovakia	Josef Šídlo (TCH)	5:34:30	16:36:45
12	Yugoslavia	Josip Šolar (YUG)	5:25:37	16:48:53
12	Yugoslavia	Stjepan Ljubić (YUG)	5:37:02	16:48:53
12	Yugoslavia	Josip Škrabl (YUG)	5:46:14	16:48:53
13	Poland	Eugeniusz Michalak (POL)	5:37:02	17:16:35
13	Poland	Józef Stefański (POL)	5:47:15	17:16:35
13	Poland	Stanisław Kłosowicz (POL)	5:51:31	17:16:35
14	Canada	Joe Laporte (CAN)	5:21:30	17:22:01
14	Canada	Alfred Tourville (CAN)	5:51:05	17:22:01
14	Canada	William Peden (CAN)	6:09:26	17:22:01
15	United States	Chester Nelsen (USA)	5:42:57	17:32:52
15	United States	Henry O'Brien (USA)	5:53:23	17:32:52
15	United States	Peter Smessaert (USA)	5:56:32	17:32:52
