= Leo Nielsen =

Danish cyclist

Personal information
- Full name: Carl Leo Holger Nielsen
- Born: 5 March 1909 Randers, Denmark
- Died: 15 June 1968 (aged 59) Copenhagen, Denmark

Cycling career
- Sport: Cycling
Medal record
Representing DEN
Men's cycling
Olympic Games
Gold medal – first place	1928 Amsterdam	Team road race
Silver medal – second place	1932 Los Angeles	Team road race
World Championships
Bronze medal – third place	1931 Copenhagen	Amateur's Road Race

Carl Leo Holger Nielsen (5 March 1909 – 15 June 1968) was a Danish track cyclist who won a gold medal at the 1928 Summer Olympics with Henry Hansen and Orla Jørgensen and a silver medal at the 1932 Summer Olympics with Hansen and Frode Sørensen.
