= Johan Hellström =

Finnish boxer

Karl Johan "Jonni" Hellström (13 May 1907 – 6 November 1988) was a Finnish boxer who competed in the 1928 Summer Olympics. "The Fighting Finn" was born in Mariehamn and died in Verdun, Montreal, Canada. In 1928 he was eliminated in the quarter-finals of the welterweight class after losing his fight to Robert Galataud.

== 1928 Olympic results ==
- Round of 32: bye
- Round of 16: defeated Fred Ellis (South Africa) on points
- Quarterfinal: lost to Robert Galataud (France) on points
