= Arne Sande =

Danish boxer (1905–1985)

Medal record

Men's amateur boxing

Representing Denmark

European Amateur Championships
Silver medal – second place	1927 Berlin	Lightweight
Bronze medal – third place	1925 Stockholm	Lightweight

Arne Sande (18 March 1905 in Moss, Norway – 31 May 1985 in Copenhagen, Denmark) was a Danish boxer who competed in the 1928 Summer Olympics.

In 1932 he was eliminated in the first round of the welterweight class after losing his fight to Patrick Lenehan.

== Amateur sports ==
As an amateur Arne Sande fought for IF Sparta. He won the Danish Amateur Championship in Lightweight in 1925, 1926 and 1927. In 1927 he won the European Championship in amateur welterweight.
