= Harald Nielsen (boxer) =

Danish boxer

Medal record

Men's amateur boxing

Representing Denmark

European Amateur Championships
Gold medal – first place	1925 Stockholm	Welterweight

Harald Laderstoff Nielsen (23 February 1902 – 14 March 1983) was a Danish boxer who won a gold medal at the 1925 European Amateur Boxing Championships in the welterweight division. In 1924 Nielsen competed in the Summer Olympics. He was born and died in Copenhagen.

In 1924 he was eliminated in the first round of the welterweight class after losing his fight to Giuseppe Oldani. In 1925 he claimed the welterweight title at the 1925 European Amateur Boxing Championships by defeating Helge Ahlberg in the final.
