= Erik Jansson (cyclist) =

Swedish cyclist

Personal information
- Born: 17 May 1907 Sundborn, Sweden
- Died: 24 July 1993 (aged 86) Uppsala, Sweden

Cycling career
- Sport: Cycling
Medal record
Representing SWE
Men's cycling
Olympic Games
Bronze medal – third place	1928 Amsterdam	Team road race

Erik Jansson (14 May 1907 – 24 July 1993) was a Swedish road racing cyclist who competed in the 1928 Summer Olympics.

In 1928 he won the bronze medal as part of the Swedish road cycling team, after finishing 14th in the individual road race.
