= 1927 European Amateur Boxing Championships =

Boxing competitions

- Host city: Berlin
- Country: Germany
- Nations: 13
- Athletes: 50
- Dates: 16–20 May

The 1927 European Amateur Boxing Championships were held in Berlin, Germany from 16 to 20 May. It was the second edition of the competition, organised by the European governing body for amateur boxing, EABA. There were 50 fighters from 13 countries participating.

== Medal winners ==
| Event | Gold | Silver | Bronze |
|---|---|---|---|
| Flyweight (– 50.8 kilograms) | Lennart Bohman; Sweden | Antal Kocsis; Hungary | Heinz Brofazi; Germany |
| Bantamweight (– 53.5 kilograms) | Kurt Dalchow; Germany | Gaetano Lanzi; Italy | Bobby Spunner; Austria |
| Featherweight (– 57.1 kilograms) | Franz Dübbers; Germany | Harry Wolff; Sweden | Miklós Gelbai-Gelb; Hungary |
| Lightweight (– 61.2 kilograms) | Jacob Domgörgen; Germany | Arne Sande; Denmark | Gunnar Berggren; Sweden |
| Welterweight (– 66.7 kilograms) | Romano Caneva; Italy | Gustave Roth; Belgium | István Balázs; Hungary |
| Middleweight (– 72.6 kilograms) | Edgar Christensen; Norway | Wilhelm Maier; Germany | Olaf Falk; Sweden |
| Light Heavyweight (– 79.4 kilograms) | Hein Müller; Germany | Karel Miljon; Netherlands | Clas Engström; Sweden |
| Heavyweight (+ 79.4 kilograms) | Nils Ramm; Sweden | Hans Schönrath; Germany | Michael Michaelsen; Denmark |

== Medal table ==
| Rank | Nation | Gold | Silver | Bronze | Total |
|---|---|---|---|---|---|
| 1 | Germany (GER) | 4 | 2 | 1 | 7 |
| 2 | Sweden (SWE) | 2 | 1 | 3 | 6 |
| 3 | Italy (ITA) | 1 | 1 | 0 | 2 |
| 4 | Norway (NOR) | 1 | 0 | 0 | 1 |
| 5 | Hungary (HUN) | 0 | 1 | 2 | 3 |
| 6 | Denmark (DEN) | 0 | 1 | 1 | 2 |
| 7 | Belgium (BEL) | 0 | 1 | 0 | 1 |
| 7 | Netherlands (NED) | 0 | 1 | 0 | 1 |
| 9 | Austria (AUT) | 0 | 0 | 1 | 1 |
| Totals (9 entries) | | 8 | 8 | 8 | 24 |
