= David Lindsay (rugby union) =

New Zealand rugby union player (1906–1978)

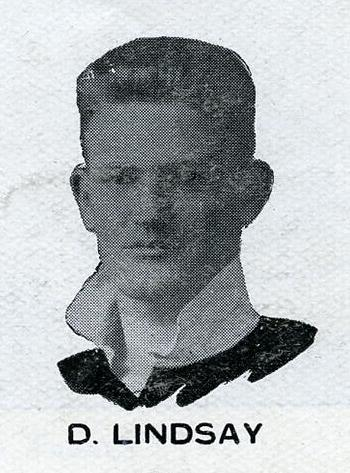
- Born: David Frederick Lindsay; 9 December 1906 Studholme, New Zealand
- Died: 7 March 1978 (aged 71) Timaru, New Zealand
- Height: 1.75 m (5 ft 9 in)
- Weight: 85 kg (187 lb)
- School: Timaru Boys' High School
- University: University of Otago
- Notable relative: David Lindsay (cousin)
- Occupation: Dentist

Rugby union career
- Position: Utility back
Provincial / State sides
Years	Team	Apps	(Points)
1927–1930	Otago	11	
International career
Years	Team	Apps	(Points)
1927	New Zealand Universities		
1928	New Zealand	3	(3)

David Frederick Lindsay (9 December 1906 – 7 March 1978) was a New Zealand rugby union player. A utility back, Lindsay played in positions from five-eighth to fullback. He represented Otago at a provincial level, and was a member of the New Zealand national side, the All Blacks, on their 1928 tour of South Africa. On that tour he was the first-choice fullback, and played 11 matches including three of the four internationals.

Lindsay practised as a dentist in Timaru and Invercargill, and later worked at Timaru Hospital. He continued his involvement in rugby, and was a South Canterbury selector in 1945 and 1946. He was a cousin of Olympic swimmer David Lindsay. The Lindsay Wing, part of the accommodation for boarders at Timaru Boys' High School, is named in honour of the two cousins who both attended the school.

Lindsay died in Timaru on 7 March 1978, and was buried at Timaru Cemetery.
