= Len Moorhouse =

New Zealand swimmer (1904–1970)

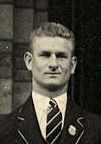
- Moorhouse in 1928

Personal information
- Full name: Leonard James Moorhouse
- Born: 14 March 1904 Dunedin, New Zealand
- Died: 4 May 1970 (aged 66) Marlborough or Christchurch (sources differ)

Sport
- Sport: Swimming

Leonard James Moorhouse (14 March 1904 – 4 May 1970) was a New Zealand swimmer who competed at the 1928 Summer Olympics.

== Early life and family ==
Moorhouse was born in Dunedin in 1904. He had four sisters and three brothers (one died as an infant). His father, Charles Edwin Moorhouse, was a keen yachtsman in Otago in his early years. His grandfather, William Sefton Moorhouse, was a nephew of the second Superintendent of Canterbury Province of the same name.

As a teenager, he suffered an accident that disfigured his foot, and his left leg was shorter than the other one. He received aquarobic therapy and spent so much time in the water that at age 18, he started competing in swimming. His disability was serious enough that he had difficulty walking, and being in water was a relief.

== Competitive swimming ==
He was one of two swimmers from Christchurch to compete at the 1928 Summer Olympics in swimming; the other Christchurch competitor was Dave Lindsay. At the time of the 1928 Olympics, Moorhouse was the New Zealand backstroke champion for 100 m, 200 m, 400 m, and 150 yards. Lindsay was considered New Zealand's strongest swimmer, followed by Ena Stockley from Dunedin. Moorhouse was ranked third and thus did not qualify for financial assistance, but he chose to travel to the Amsterdam Olympics at his own expense. The costs were estimated to be NZ£400 per athlete.

At the Olympics, Moorhouse competed in the 100 metre backstroke event. He came third in his heat, with only the top two swimmers qualifying for the semi-finals. After the Olympic Games, he was highly critical of the training conditions in Amsterdam, where the American competitors were given preferential treatment and had access to the competition pool, whilst the New Zealand swimmers were given 10 minutes per day to train in a canal with stagnant water polluted with oil from ships. He lobbied for trainers to accompany all Olympic sports, even if that meant that fewer athletes could be sent. Moorhouse was the swim manager for the 1950 British Empire Games held in Auckland.

== Later life ==
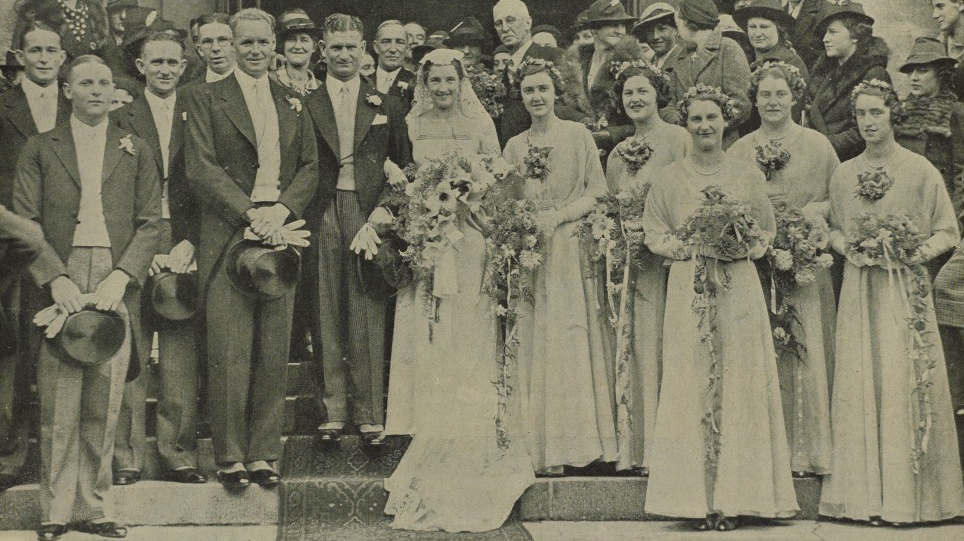
Moorhouse's wedding to Peg Blunden, Christchurch, 1937

On 3 April 1937, Moorhouse married Kathleen Margaret "Peg" Blunden (born July 1917) at St Paul's Church in Christchurch. At the time of their wedding, he was 33 and she was 19 years old. Fellow swimmer Dave Lindsay acted as best man. A reception was held at her aunt and uncle's place Risingholme in Opawa; her uncle was the son of John Anderson, the second Mayor of Christchurch. After the wedding, the Moorhouses lived in Deans Avenue fronting Hagley Park.

For most of his life, Moorhouse worked for Dominion Breweries. In 1958, they bought a home in the Marlborough Sounds. In the 1960s, they bought a house in Sunshine Bay near Waikawa, north-east of Picton. He died on 4 May 1970; sources differ as to whether this happened at Sunshine Bay in the Marlborough Region or in Christchurch. He is buried at Picton Cemetery. His wife—weaver Peg Moorhouse—died on 26 January 2024, at the age of 106.
