= Selfrid Johansson =

Swedish boxer

Medal record

Men's amateur boxing

Representing Sweden

European Amateur Championships
Gold medal – first place	1925 Stockholm	Lightweight

Selfrid F. Johansson (March 12, 1907 – July 26, 1976) was a Swedish boxer who competed in the 1928 Summer Olympics.

In 1928 he was eliminated in the second round of the welterweight class after losing his fight to the upcoming gold medalist Ted Morgan.
