= Romano Caneva =

Italian boxer (1904–1980)

Medal record

Men's amateur boxing

Representing Italy

European Amateur Championships
Gold medal – first place	1927 Berlin	Welterweight

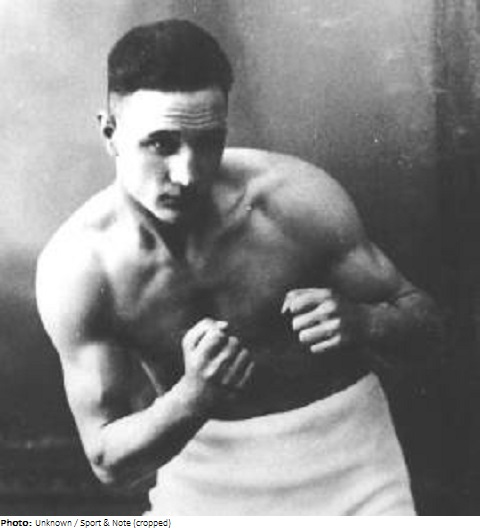

Romano Caneva (December 11, 1904 in Milan – August 8, 1980) was an Italian boxer who competed in the 1928 Summer Olympics.

In 1928, he was eliminated in the quarter-finals of the welterweight class after losing his fight to the upcoming gold medalist Ted Morgan.

== 1928 Olympic results ==
Below is the record of Romano Caneva, an Italian welterweight boxer who competed at the 1928 Amsterdam Olympics:

- Round of 32: bye
- Round of 16: defeated Harry Dunn (Great Britain) on points
- Quarterfinal: lost to Ted Morgan (New Zealand) on points
