= Knockout (1935 film) =

1935 film

- DVD cover
- German: Knockout – Ein Junges Mädchen, ein Junger Mann
- Directed by: Carl Lamac; Hans H. Zerlett
- Written by: Hans H. Zerlett
- Produced by: Artur Hohenberg; Carl Lamac; Anny Ondra
- Starring: Anny Ondra; Max Schmeling; Hans Schönrath
- Cinematography: Otto Heller; Gustl A. Weiss; Ludwig Zahn
- Edited by: Ella Ensink
- Music by: Leo Leux
- Production companies: Ondra-Lamac-Film; Bavaria Film
- Distributed by: Bavaria Film
- Release date: 1 March 1935
- Running time: 83 minutes
- Country: Germany
- Language: German

Knockout (German: Knockout – Ein Junges Mädchen, ein Junger Mann) is a 1935 German sports film directed by Carl Lamac and Hans H. Zerlett and starring Anny Ondra, Max Schmeling, and Hans Schönrath.

Schmeling was a leading international boxer, and the film was an attempt to capitalize on his fame. Schmeling and Ondra, who plays the romantic love interest, were married in real life. The film was shot at the Bavaria Studios in Munich. Its sets were designed by the art directors Wilhelm Depenau and Erich Zander.

== Plot ==
After impressing a boxing trainer during a brawl over a woman, a young man is recruited and trained to be a boxer. He goes on to fight and defeat the British champion.

== Cast ==
- Anny Ondra as Marianne Plümke
- Max Schmeling as Max Breuer
- Hans Schönrath as Hawkins, Boxer
- Edith Meinhard as Fräulein Melitta
- Fritz Odemar as Theater director
- Anni Markart as Camilla
- Hans Richter as Josef, auxiliary illuminator
- Otto Wernicke as P. F. Schmidtchen
- Wilhelm Bendow as Der Assistant
- Karl Platen as Der Inspizient
- Hermann Meyer-Falkow as Der Trainer
- Josef Eichheim as Der Mann, der seinen Hut aufißt
- Paul Samson-Körner as Boxer Hütgen
- Max Schreck as head of the Artist Agency
- Isa Vermehren as singer from Hamburg
- Annie Ann
- Lilian Bergo
- Cornelius Booth
- Beppo Brem
- O. E. Hasse
- Manfred Matwin
- Charlotte Radspieler
- Rosi Rauch as Singer
- Ernst Rotmund
- Karl Schopp
- Egon Stief
