= John Middleton (cyclist) =

British racing cyclist (1906–1991)

Personal information
- Born: 21 June 1906 Coventry, Warwickshire, England
- Died: 24 January 1991 (aged 84) Bromsgrove, Worcestershire, England

Cycling career
- Sport: Cycling
Medal record
Representing GBR
Men's cycling
Olympic Games
Silver medal – second place	1928 Amsterdam	Team road race

John Kenneth Middleton (21 June 1906 – 24 January 1991) was a British racing cyclist who competed in the 1928 Summer Olympics. He won the silver medal as a member of the British road racing team in the team road race, after finishing 26th in the individual road race.
