= Alf Cleverley =

New Zealand boxer (1907–1992)

- Cleverley in 1928

Personal information
- Born: Alfred John Cleverley; 18 September 1907
- Died: 2 August 1992 (aged 84) Rotorua, New Zealand

Sport
- Sport: Boxing

Alfred John Cleverley (18 September 1907 – 2 August 1992) was a New Zealand boxer from Petone.

He competed in the 1928 Olympics in the men's light-heavyweight section, but lost on points in the first round to Alf Jackson of Great Britain. After the Olympics he competed in the Tailtean Games in Dublin then fought professionally in Long Beach, California. He returned to New Zealand in 1930, married, and resumed work at the Railways Workshops at Petone then at the Hutt as a fitter.

He died in Rotorua on 25 July 1992.

== 1928 Olympic results ==
Below is the record of Alf Cleverley, a New Zealand light heavyweight boxer who competed at the 1928 Amsterdam Olympics:

- Round of 16: lost to Alf Jackson (Great Britain) by decision
