= 1925 European Amateur Boxing Championships =

Boxing competitions

- Host city: Stockholm
- Country: Sweden
- Nations: 12
- Athletes: 46
- Dates: 11–15 May

The 1925 European Amateur Boxing Championships were held in Stockholm, Sweden, from 11 to 15 May. It was the first edition of the competition, organised by the European governing body for amateur boxing, EABA. There were 46 fighters from 12 countries participating.

== Medal winners ==
Event	Gold	Silver	Bronze
Flyweight (– 50.8 kilograms)	Émile Pladner; France	J. W. James; England	Karl Schulze; Germany
Bantamweight (– 53.5 kilograms)	Archie Rule; England	Franz Dübbers; Germany	Axel Norman; Norway
Featherweight (– 57.1 kilograms)	Oscar Andrén; Sweden	Jacob Domgörgen; Germany	Richard Madsen; Denmark
Lightweight (– 61.2 kilograms)	Selfrid Johansson; Sweden	Signaller Viney; England	Arne Sande; Denmark
Welterweight (– 66.7 kilograms)	Harald Nielsen; Denmark	Helge Ahlberg; Sweden	Hein Müller; Germany
Middleweight (– 72.6 kilograms)	Frank Crawley; England	Hans Holdt; Denmark	Franz Krüppel; Germany
Light Heavyweight (– 79.4 kilograms)	Thyge Petersen; Denmark	Nils Ramm; Sweden	Karel Miljon; Netherlands
Heavyweight (+ 79.4 kilograms)	Bror Persson; Sweden	Dudley Lister; England	Helmuth Siewert; Germany

== Medal table ==
Rank	Nation	Gold	Silver	Bronze	Total
1	Sweden (SWE)	3	2	0	5
2	England (ENG)	2	3	0	5
3	Denmark (DEN)	2	1	2	5
4	France (FRA)	1	0	0	1
5	Germany (GER)	0	2	4	6
6	Netherlands (NED)	0	0	1	1
6	Norway (NOR)	0	0	1	1
Totals (7 entries)		8	8	8	24
