= David Lindsay (swimmer) =

New Zealand swimmer

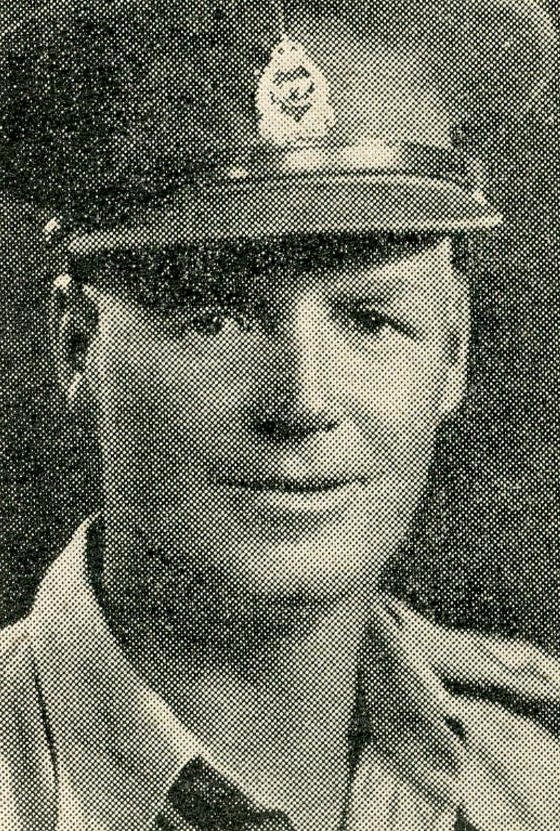
- Lindsay during World War II

Personal information
- Full name: David Powell Lindsay
- Born: 12 November 1906 Wellington, New Zealand
- Died: 12 December 1943 (aged 37) Orsogna, Italy
- Relative: David Lindsay (cousin)

Sport
- Country: New Zealand
- Sport: Swimming

David Powell Lindsay (12 November 1906 – 12 December 1943) was a New Zealand swimmer.

Lindsay was born in Wellington in 1906. He received his education at Timaru Boys' High School. He moved to Christchurch and was one of two swimmers from that city who competed in swimming (two events) at the 1928 Summer Olympics; the other competitor was Len Moorhouse.

Lindsay later lived in Dannevirke. In 1937, he was best man at Len Moorhouse's wedding to Peg Blunden. Lindsay was killed in action during World War II, dying in the battle for Orsogna when a 25-pounder gun fired a shell into his platoon, killing him and several others.

Lindsay's cousin, All Black David Lindsay, also attended Timaru Boys' High and he also represented New Zealand internationally in 1928. Lindsay Wing, a wing at the school's boarding hostel, commemorates them jointly.
