= Josip Škrabl =

Yugoslav cyclist

Personal information
- Full name: Josip Škrabl
- Born: 28 January 1903
- Died: 6 June 1973 (aged 70)

Cycling career
- Sport: Cycling

Josip Škrabl (28 January 1903 – 6 June 1973) was a Yugoslav cyclist. He competed in the individual and team road race events at the 1928 Summer Olympics.
