= Wilfrid Kalaugher =

New Zealand athlete and scholar

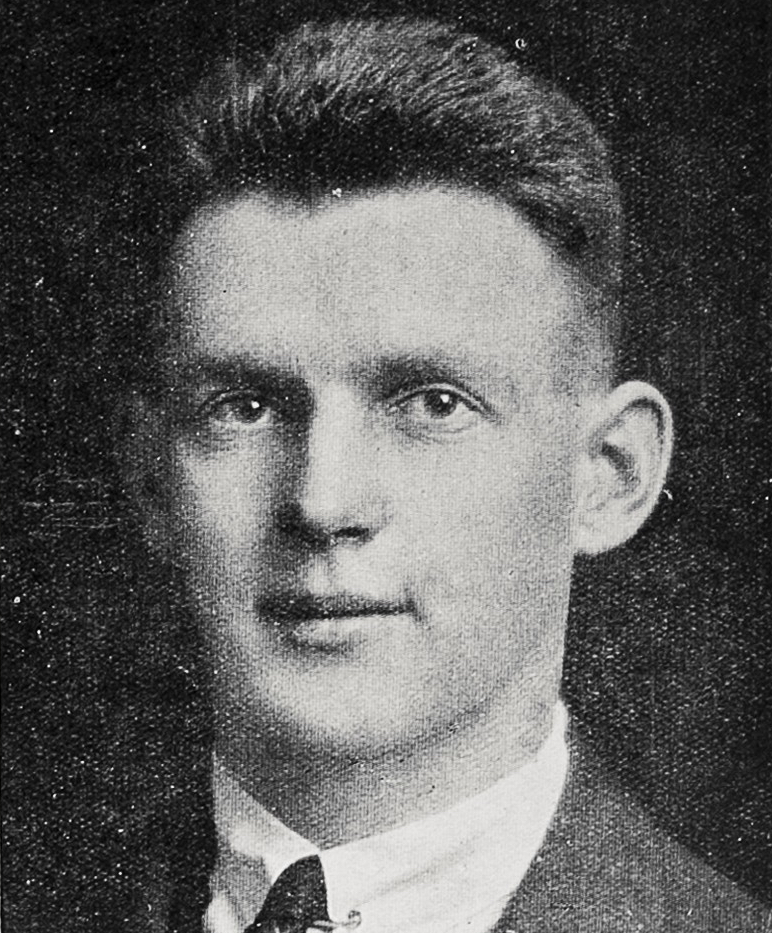
- Kalaugher, c. 1926
- Born: 26 November 1904; Winchester, New Zealand
- Died: 12 August 1999 (aged 94)
- Other names: Wilfrid George Kalaugher
- Occupation(s): Olympic athlete, Rhodes Scholar, teacher
- Sports career
- Sport: Athletics
- Event: hurdles/triple jump
- Club: University of Oxford AC; Achilles Club

Wilfrid George Kalaugher (26 November 1904 – 12 August 1999) was a New Zealand athlete and scholar. He was a school master in Marlborough College, England.

== Biography ==
Kalaugher was born in Winchester, New Zealand and he grew up in Devonport. He was dux of Sacred Heart College, Auckland in 1921, where there is now a wing named after him. He attended Victoria University of Wellington, where he studied mathematics and competed in athletics, cricket, and rugby.

In 1926, he was selected as a Rhodes Scholar to Balliol College, Oxford, where he represented Oxford University in first-class cricket from 1928 to 1931. At the same time he played Minor Counties Championship cricket for Oxfordshire. While at Oxford University, he gained an Oxford Blue after winning a hurdles title.

He represented New Zealand at the 1928 Summer Olympics in Amsterdam, competing in the triple jump and 110 m hurdles.

In 1931, he took up a teaching position at Marlborough College, England, and found his career "amid the playing fields and schools of England". He died in Newcastle upon Tyne.
