= Cai Gundelach =

Danish equestrian

Personal information
- Nationality: Danish
- Born: 5 February 1891; Frederiksberg, Denmark
- Died: 11 March 1954 (aged 63); Gentofte, Denmark

Sport
- Sport: Equestrian

Cai Gundelach (5 February 1891 – 11 March 1954) was a Danish equestrian. He competed in the individual eventing at the 1928 Summer Olympics.
