= Inger Klint =

Danish fencer

Personal information
- Nationality: Danish
- Born: 20 November 1890 Copenhagen, Denmark
- Died: 7 January 1967 (aged 76) Copenhagen, Denmark

Sport
- Sport: Fencing
- Club: Fægteklubben Cirklen

Inger Klint (20 November 1890 – 7 January 1967) was a Danish foil fencer. She competed at the 1928 and 1932 Summer Olympics. Inger Klint represented Fægteklubben Cirklen at club level.

She was part of the Danish team that won the European Championship in fleuret in Copenhagen 1932.
