= Magnus Fog =

Danish equestrian

Personal information
- Nationality: Danish
- Born: 1 March 1893; Assens, Denmark
- Died: 19 June 1969 (aged 76); Assens, Denmark

Sport
- Sport: Equestrian

Magnus Fog (1 March 1893 – 19 June 1969) was a Danish equestrian. He competed in the individual dressage event at the 1928 Summer Olympics.
