= Francisco Uranga =

Argentine swimmer

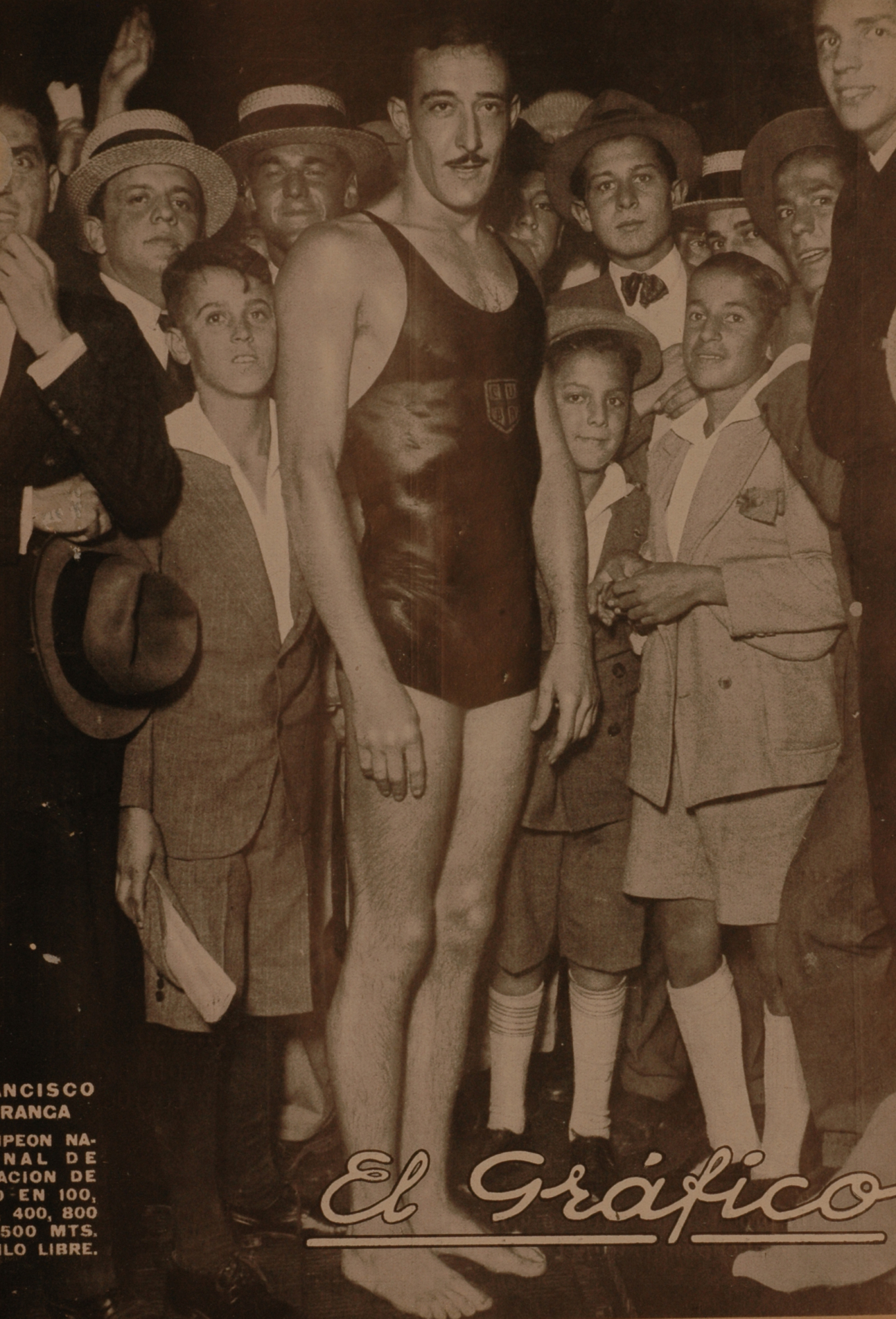

Personal information
- Born: 1905

Sport
- Sport: Swimming

Francisco Uranga (born 1905, date of death unknown) was an Argentine freestyle swimmer. He competed in two events and the water polo tournament at the 1928 Summer Olympics.
