= Sverre Sørsdal =

Norwegian boxer (1900–1996)

Olympic medal record

Men's Boxing
Silver medal – second place	1920 Antwerp	Light Heavyweight
Bronze medal – third place	1924 Paris	Light Heavyweight

Sverre Sørsdal (5 August 1900 – 21 March 1996) was a Norwegian boxer who competed in the 1920 Summer Olympics, in the 1924 Summer Olympics, and in the 1928 Summer Olympics.

Sørsdal was born in Hamar, Norway. He trained as a medical student while pursuing his boxing career, boxing for Akademisk Boxe-Klub. As a doctor he later attained the position of head of department at Vardø Hospital in Finnmark. He was awarded the King's Medal of Merit (Kongens fortjenstmedalje) upon his retirement.

In 1920 he won the silver medal in the light heavyweight class after losing in the final to Eddie Eagan. Four years later he won the bronze medal in the same weight division when he won the bronze medal bout against Carlo Saraudi. In the 1928 Summer Olympics he finished fourth in the heavyweight competition. He was unable to compete in the bronze medal bout against Michael Michaelsen, after losing in the semifinal to Nils Ramm.
