= Peder Jensen (equestrian) =

Danish equestrian

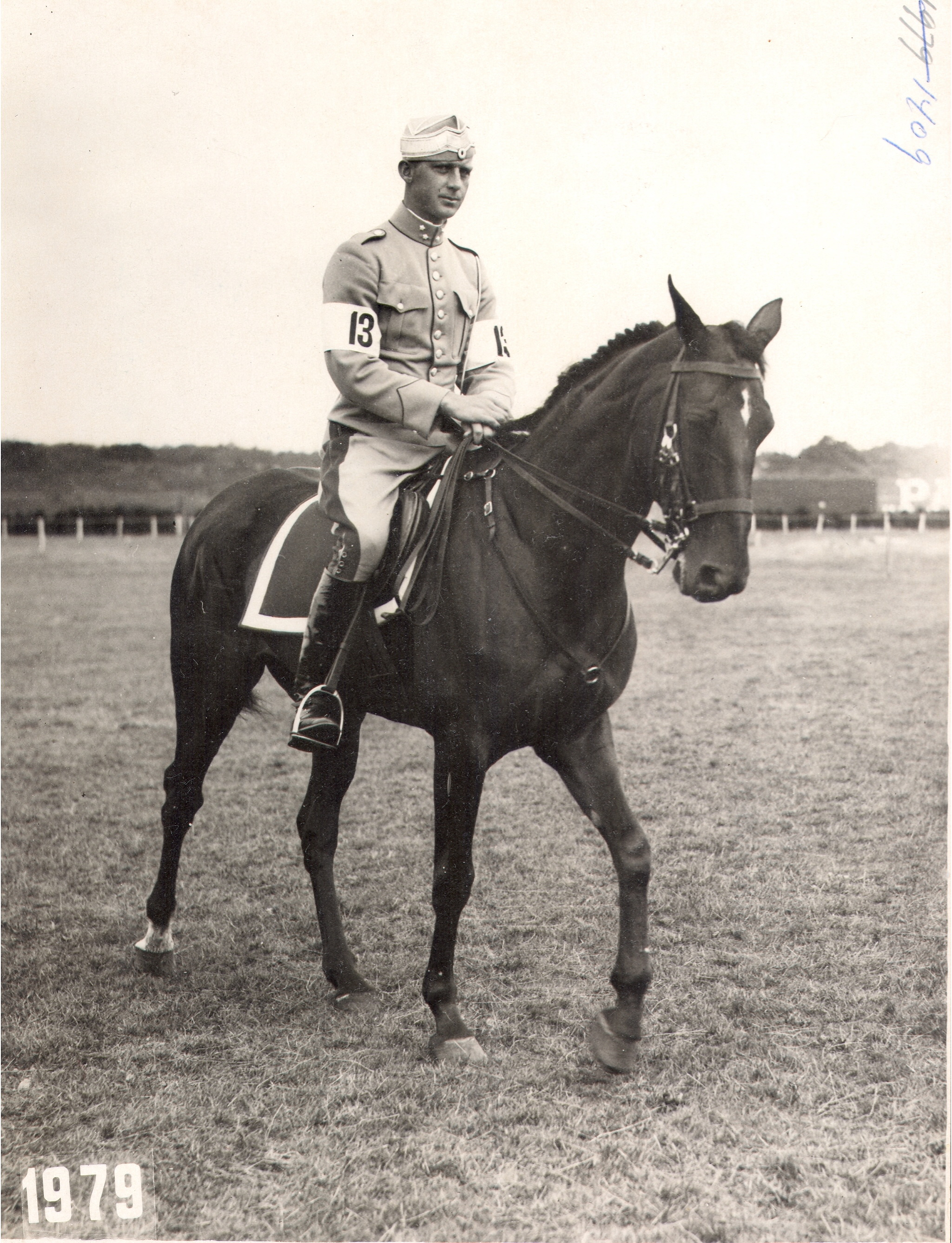
- Peder Jensen in 1928

Personal information
- Nationality: Danish
- Born: 12 October 1897; Vordingborg, Denmark
- Died: 13 November 1938 (aged 41); Sjælland, Denmark

Sport
- Sport: Equestrian

Peder Jensen (12 October 1897 – 13 November 1938) was a Danish equestrian. He competed at the 1928 Summer Olympics and the 1936 Summer Olympics.
