= Orla Jørgensen =

Danish cyclist

Personal information
- Born: 25 May 1904 Gentofte, Denmark
- Died: 29 June 1947 (aged 43) Gentofte, Denmark

Cycling career
- Sport: Cycling
Medal record
Representing DEN
Men's cycling
Olympic Games
Gold medal – first place	1928 Amsterdam	Team road race

Orla Jørgensen (25 May 1904 – 29 June 1947) was a male Danish racing cyclist who won a gold medal at the 1928 Summer Olympics with Henry Hensen and Leo Nielsen.
