= Francisco Bonvehi =

Argentine cyclist

Personal information
- Born: 1905

Cycling career
- Sport: Cycling

Francisco Bonvehi (born 1905, date of death unknown) was an Argentine cyclist. He competed in the individual and team road race events at the 1928 Summer Olympics.
