= Louis Lundgren =

Danish sprinter (1901–1976)

Personal information
- Nationality: Danish
- Born: 24 April 1901 Randers, Denmark
- Died: 26 September 1976 (aged 75) Copenhagen, Denmark

Sport
- Sport: Sprinting
- Event: 400 metres

Louis Lundgren (24 April 1901 – 26 September 1976) was a Danish sprinter. He competed in the men's 400 metres at the 1928 Summer Olympics.
