= Dionisio Fernández (boxer) =

Spanish boxer

Personal information
- Nationality: Spanish
- Born: 4 October 1907; Zamora, Spain

Sport
- Sport: Boxing

Dionisio Fernández (born 4 October 1907, date of death unknown) was a Spanish boxer. He competed in the men's welterweight event at the 1928 Summer Olympics.
