= Georges Gardebois =

French boxer

Personal information
- Nationality: French
- Born: 18 September 1907
- Died: 23 August 1977 (aged 69)

Sport
- Sport: Boxing

Georges Gardebois (18 September 1907 – 23 August 1977) was a French boxer. He competed in the men's heavyweight event at the 1928 Summer Olympics.
