= Norma Wilson =

New Zealand sprinter (1909–2000)

- Wilson in 1928

Personal information
- Born: 11 December 1909
- Died: 10 July 2000 (aged 90)

Sport
- Sport: Sprinting

Norma Wilson (11 December 1909 – 10 July 2000) was a New Zealand athlete who represented New Zealand at the 1928 Summer Olympics in Amsterdam.

Born in Gisborne, New Zealand, she was a member of her local athletics club and by the time she was 18 years old she was dubbed the New Zealand Lady Flier by the media, she had twice equalled the 100 yards World Records but on both occasions the tracks were deemed seven inches too short.

Wilson was the first woman track athlete to represent New Zealand at an Olympics when she competed in the 100 metres, where even with the lack of experience in using a cinder track she finished second in her first round heat, before finishing in fifth place in the semi-final heat.

She told the “stuffed shirt” officials when she returned that New Zealand needed a cinder track. She also refused to run in a Basin Reserve appearance unless she could wear shorts, and in no time, all the girls were wearing shorts.

She married Ted Morgan, a New Zealand boxer at the same Olympics, in 1933 but divorced him in 1938. She then married Rangi Marsh, a jockey and lived in Hastings.
