= Albert Nuss =

Luxembourgish boxer

Personal information
- Nationality: Luxembourgish
- Born: 28 February 1907; Luxembourg, Luxembourg
- Died: 14 July 1969 (aged 62); Luxembourg, Luxembourg

Sport
- Sport: Boxing

Albert Nuss (28 February 1907 – 14 July 1969) was a Luxembourgish boxer. He competed in the men's welterweight event at the 1928 Summer Olympics.
