= Gerry Coughlan =

Irish middle-distance runner

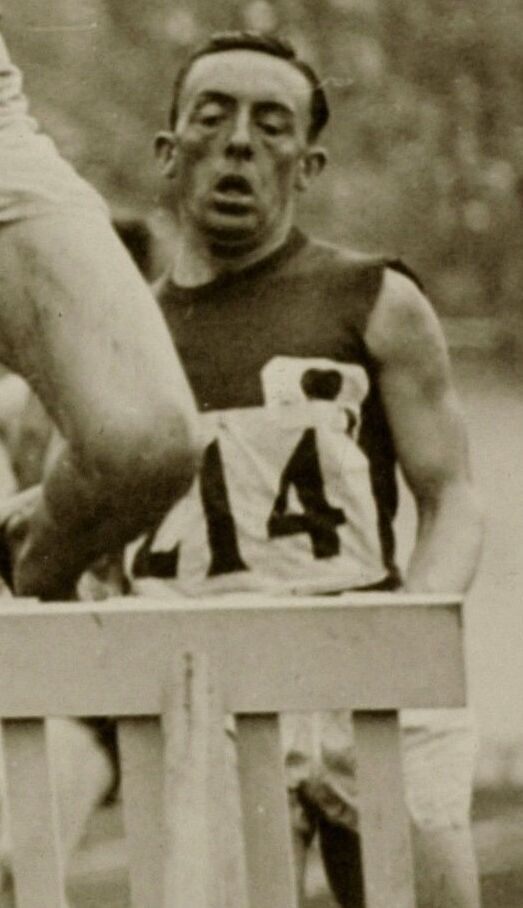
- Gerry Coughlan in 1928

Personal information
- Nationality: Irish
- Born: 23 March 1903 Youghal, Kingdom of Great Britain and Ireland
- Died: 6 March 1983 (aged 79) Boca Raton, Florida, United States

Sport
- Sport: Middle-distance running
- Event: 800 metres

Gerry Coughlan (23 March 1903 – 6 March 1983) was an Irish middle-distance runner. He competed in the men's 800 metres and men's 3000 metres steeplechase at the 1928 Summer Olympics.
