= José López (cyclist) =

Argentine cyclist

José H. López
Personal information
- Full name: José Horacio López Aguiar
- Born: 1910 La Plata, Buenos Aires
- Died: 29 September 2004 (aged 93–94) La Plata, Buenos Aires

Cycling career
- Sport: Cycling

José Horacio López Aguiar (1910, La Plata - 2004, La Plata) was an Argentine cyclist. He competed in the individual and team road race events at the 1928 Summer Olympics.
