= Raúl Landini =

Argentine boxer

Olympic medal record

Men's Boxing
Silver medal – second place	1928 Amsterdam	Welterweight

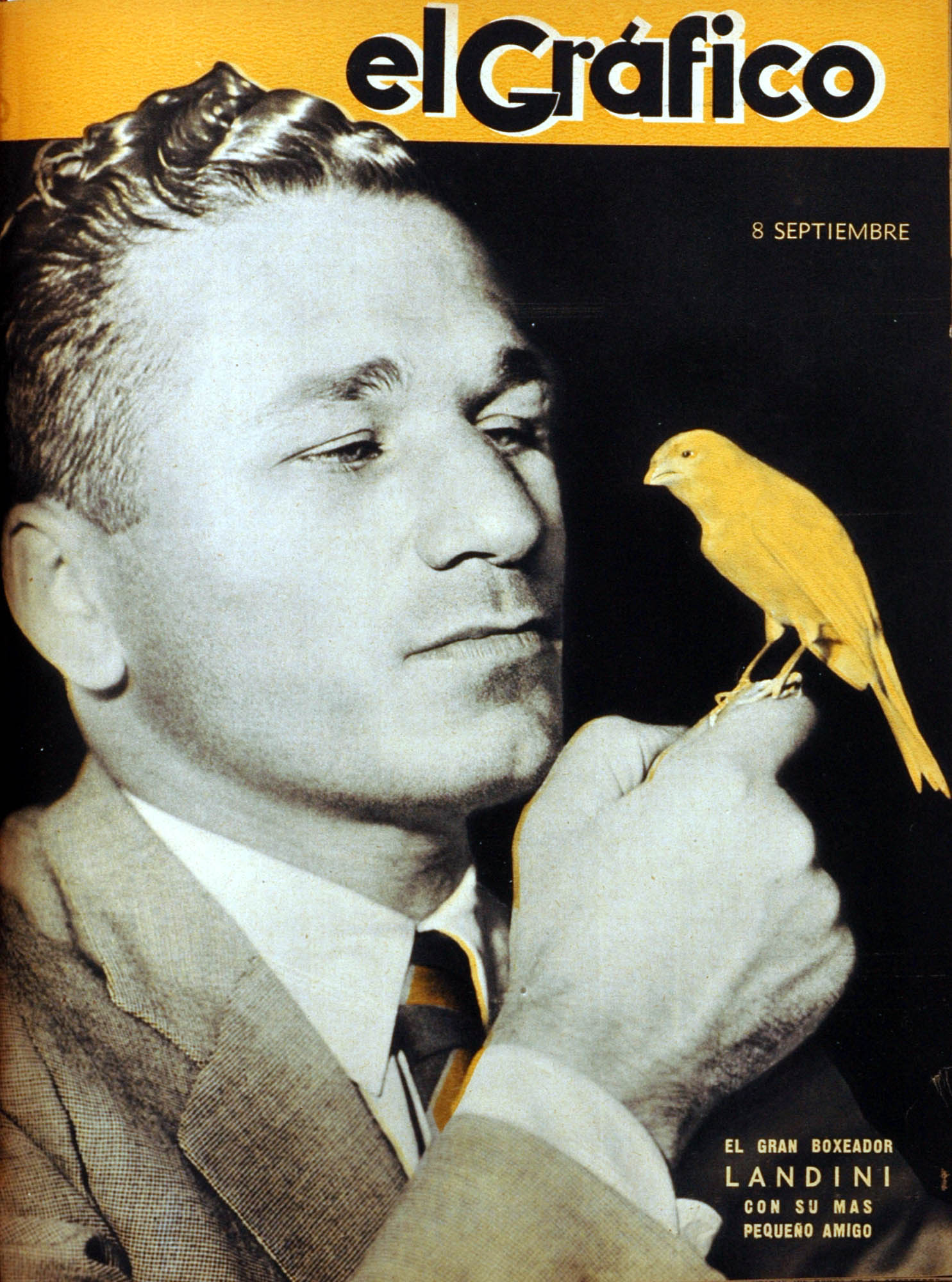
Raúl Landini

Raúl Athos Landini (July 14, 1909 – September 29, 1988) was an Argentine boxer who competed in the 1928 Summer Olympics.

He was born in Buenos Aires.

In 1928 he won the silver medal in the welterweight class after losing the final against Ted Morgan.

== 1928 Olympic results ==
Below is the record of Raul Landini, an Argentine welterweight boxer who competed at the 1928 Amsterdam Olympics:

- Round of 32: Defeated Thomas Lown (United States) on points
- Round of 16: Defeated Valter Palm (Estonia) on points
- Quarterfinal: Defeated Cor Blommers (Netherlands) on points
- Semifinal: Defeated Raymond Smillie (Canada) on points
- Final: Lost to Ted Morgan (New Zealand) on points (was awarded silver medal)
