= Peg Moorhouse =

New Zealand weaver (1917–2024)

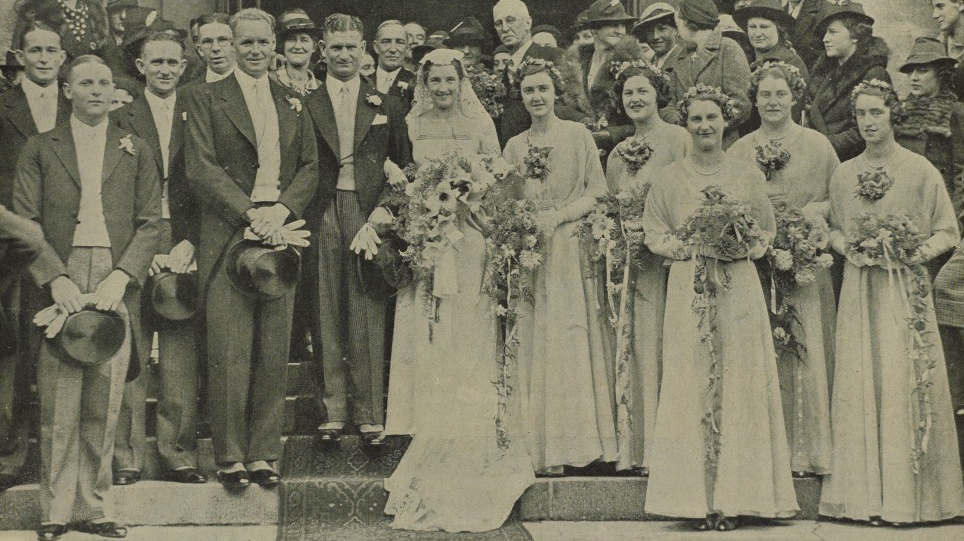
Len Moorhouse and Peg Blunden wedding, Christchurch, 1937

Kathleen Margaret "Peg" Moorhouse (née Blunden, 9 July 1917 – 23 January 2024) was a New Zealand weaver and artist.

On 3 April 1937, she married Len Moorhouse at St Paul's Church in Christchurch. In 2015 her work was included in the exhibition Gentle as the Dream She Weaves at Pātaka Art + Museum. She died on 23 January 2024, at the age of 106.
