= Thomas Lown =

American boxer

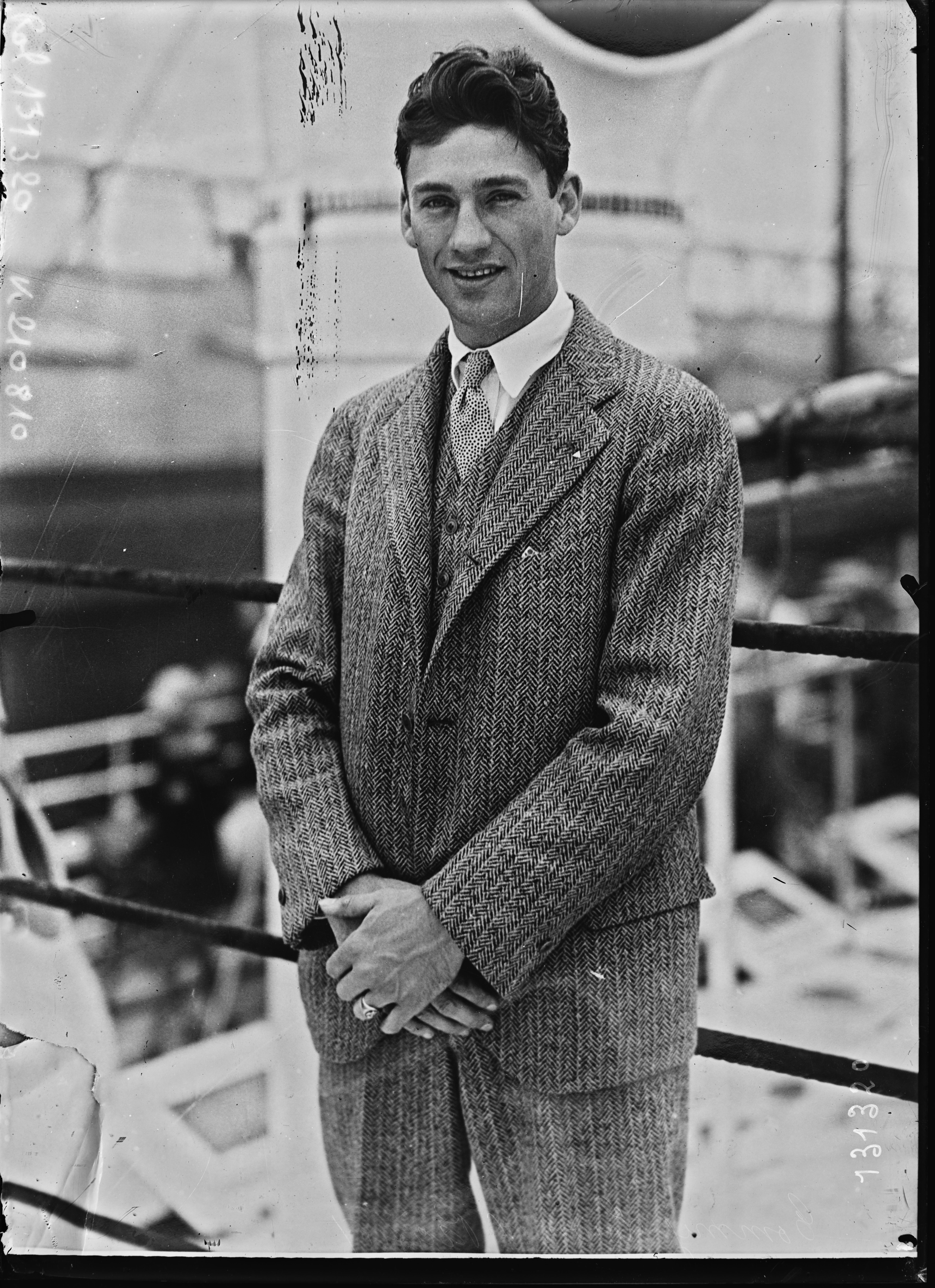

Personal information
- Nickname: "Tommy"
- Born: April 5, 1904 New York City, U.S.
- Died: September 22, 1977 (aged 73) Burnt Hills, New York, U.S.
- Weight: Welterweight

Boxing career
- Stance: Orthodox

Boxing record
- Total fights: 14
- Wins: 12
- Win by KO: 3
- Losses: 2
- Draws: 0

Thomas Lown (April 5, 1904 – September 22, 1977) was an American boxer who competed in the 1928 Summer Olympics. He was born in New York City.

In 1928, he was eliminated in the first round of the welterweight class after losing his fight to the upcoming silver medalist Raúl Landini. He took part in a total of 14 professional between March 1929 and January 1931, winning 12 (three by knockout).

Lown died in Burnt Hills, New York on September 22, 1977, aged 73.
