= Feliciano Perducca =

Argentine footballer

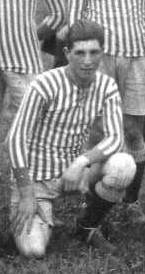
- Perducca taken in 1925

Personal information
- Full name: Feliciano Ángel Perducca
- Date of birth: 9 June 1901
- Place of birth: Argentina
- Date of death: 22 August 1976 (aged 75)
- Position: Forward

Senior career*
Years	Team	Apps	(Gls)
1923–1928	Temperley		
1928–?	Racing Club		
?–1932	Talleres (RE)		

International career
1925–1928	Argentina	5	(0)
Medal record
Men's Football
Silver medal – second place	1928 Amsterdam	Team competition
- * Club domestic league appearances and goals as of March 2008

Feliciano Ángel Perducca (9 June 1901 – 22 August 1976) was an Argentine football forward who played for the Argentina national team.

Perducca started his career in 1923 playing for Temperley. He joined Racing Club de Avellaneda around 1928 and later in his career he played for Talleres de Remedios de Escalada. Perducca played five times for Argentina, he played in Copa América 1926 and at the 1928 Olympic games.
