= Patrick Lenehan =

Irish boxer (1898–1981)

Personal information
- Nationality: Irish
- Born: 1898
- Died: 26 June 1981 (aged 82–83)

Sport
- Sport: Boxing

Patrick Lenehan (1898 – 26 June 1981) was an Irish boxer. He competed in the men's welterweight event at the 1928 Summer Olympics.
