= Cor Blommers =

Dutch boxer

Cornelis ("Cor") Franciscus Johannes Blommers (25 October 1901 in Rotterdam – 11 October 1983 in Amsterdam) was a welterweight boxer from the Netherlands, who represented his native country at the 1928 Summer Olympics in Amsterdam. There he was eliminated in the quarterfinals of the men's welterweight division by Argentina's eventual silver medalist Raúl Landini on points.
