= Víctor Fernández (equestrian) =

Argentine equestrian

Personal information
- Nationality: Argentine

Sport
- Sport: Equestrian

Víctor Fernández was an Argentine equestrian. He competed in two events at the 1928 Summer Olympics.
