= Ireland at the 1928 Summer Olympics =

- IOC code: IRL
- NOC: Olympic Federation of Ireland
- Website: olympics.ie

in Amsterdam
- Competitors: 38 (33 men, 5 women) in 6 sports
- Flag bearer: Matt Flanagan
- Medals Ranked 24th: Gold 1 Silver 0 Bronze 0 Total 1

Summer Olympics appearances (overview)
- 1924; 1928; 1932; 1936; 1948; 1952; 1956; 1960; 1964; 1968; 1972; 1976; 1980; 1984; 1988; 1992; 1996; 2000; 2004; 2008; 2012; 2016; 2020; 2024

Other related appearances
- Great Britain (1896–1920)

Ireland competed at the 1928 Summer Olympics in Amsterdam, Netherlands. 38 competitors, 33 men and 5 women, took part in 27 events in 6 sports. Ireland won its first Olympic medal as an independent nation as Pat O'Callaghan won the gold medal in the men's hammer throw.

== Medalists ==
Medal	Name	Sport	Event	Date
Gold	Pat O'Callaghan	Athletics	Men's hammer throw	30 July

== Athletics ==
Athlete	Event	Heat		Quarterfinals		Semifinal		Final	
Athlete	Event	Time	Rank	Time	Rank	Time	Rank	Time	Rank
Denis Cussen	Men's 100m	Unknown	2	Unknown	5	Did Not Advance			
Donald Cullen	Men's 200m	Unknown	3	Did Not Advance					
Sean Lavan	Men's 200m	22.9	4	Did Not Advance					
Sean Lavan	Men's 400m	Unknown	3	Unknown	5	Did Not Advance			
Gerry Coughlan	Men's 800m	Unknown	6	–		Did Not Advance			
Norman McEachern	Men's 800m	1:59.8	3	–		DNF		Did Not Advance	
Alister Clark	Men's 110m Hurdles	Unknown	3	–		Did Not Advance			
Gerry Coughlan	Men's 3000m Steeplechase	DNF		–				Did Not Advance	

=== Field ===
Athlete	Event	Qualification		Final	
Athlete	Event	Mark	Rank	Mark	Rank
Paddy Anglim	Men's Long Jump	6.81	21	Did not advance	
Theo Phelan	Men's Triple Jump	13.73	19	Did not advance	
Pat O'Callaghan	Men's Hammer Throw	47.49	3	51.39	1st place, gold medalist(s)
Con O'Callaghan	Men's decathlon	–		DNF	

== Boxing ==
Men's Flyweight (– 50.8 kg)

- Myles McDonagh

- First Round – Bye Second Round – Lost to Ben Bril (HOL), points

Men's Lightweight (-61.2 kg)

- William O'Shea
  - First Round – Lost to Jorge Diaz (CHI), points

See full results Boxing at the 1928 Summer Olympics – Men's lightweight

Men's Heavyweight (+ 79.4 kg)

- Matthew Flanagan

- First Round – Lost to Arturo Rodríguez (ARG), KO-1

== Cycling ==
Two cyclists, both men, competed for Ireland in 1928.

Individual road race

- John Woodcock – 44th

Sprint

- Bertie Donnelly

Time trial

- Bertie Donnelly – 11th

== Swimming ==
Athlete	Event	Heat		Semifinal		Final	
Athlete	Event	Time	Rank	Time	Rank	Time	Rank
Billy Broderick	Men's 400 m freestyle	Unknown	4	Did not advance			
Marguerite Dockrell	Women's 100 m freestyle	1:31.6	3	Did not advance			

== Water polo ==
Round of 16

Ireland 1-11 Belgium
