= Henry Hansen (cyclist) =

Danish cyclist

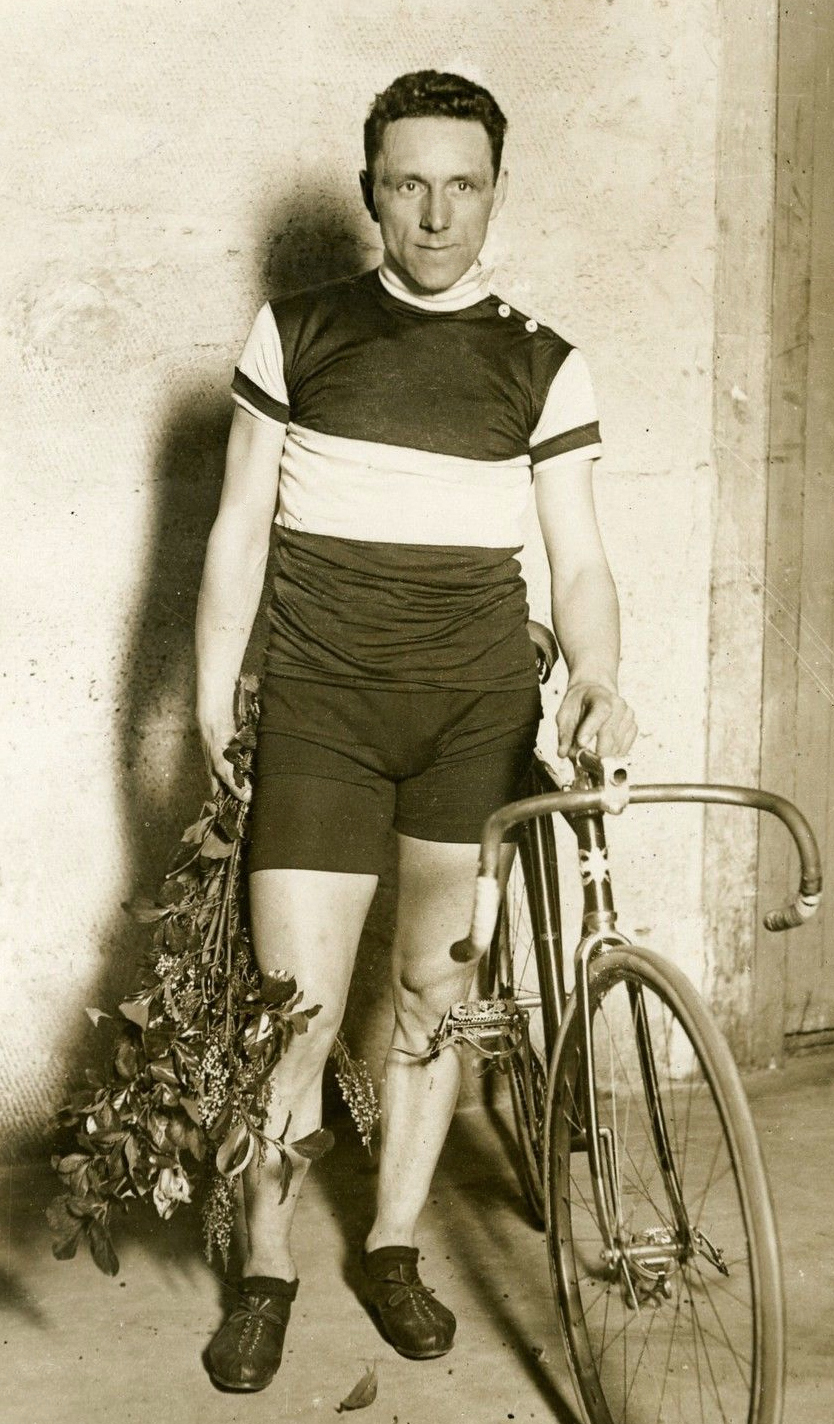
- Hansen in 1931

Personal information
- Born: 16 March 1902 Copenhagen, Denmark
- Died: 28 March 1985 (aged 83) Gentofte, Denmark
- Height: 170 cm (5 ft 7 in)

Cycling career
- Sport: Cycling
Medal record
Representing DEN
Olympic Games
Gold medal – first place	1928 Amsterdam	Individual road race
Gold medal – first place	1928 Amsterdam	Team road race
Silver medal – second place	1932 Los Angeles	Team road race
World Championships
Gold medal – first place	1931 Copenhagen	Amateur's road race

Henry Peter Christian Hansen (16 March 1902 – 28 March 1985) was a Danish road racing cyclist who won two gold medals at the 1928 Summer Olympics and a silver medal at the 1932 Summer Olympics. Hansen won the world title in 1931 and placed in the top 10 at three other world championships. At the Nordic Championships, he won the individual road race in 1925–1927 and 1929, and held the team title in 1926 and 1929. Nationally, he won the Danish championships in 1921, 1923, 1925, and 1930. In 1937 and 1938 he competed professionally without major success. After retiring from competitions he held various administrative positions, serving as Chairman of the Danish Cycling Union in 1967–1971.

Hansen's niece was married to Knud Enemark Jensen, the Danish cyclist who died during competition at the 1960 Summer Olympics.
