= Raymond Smillie =

Canadian boxer

Olympic medal record

Men's Boxing
Bronze medal – third place	1928 Amsterdam	Welterweight

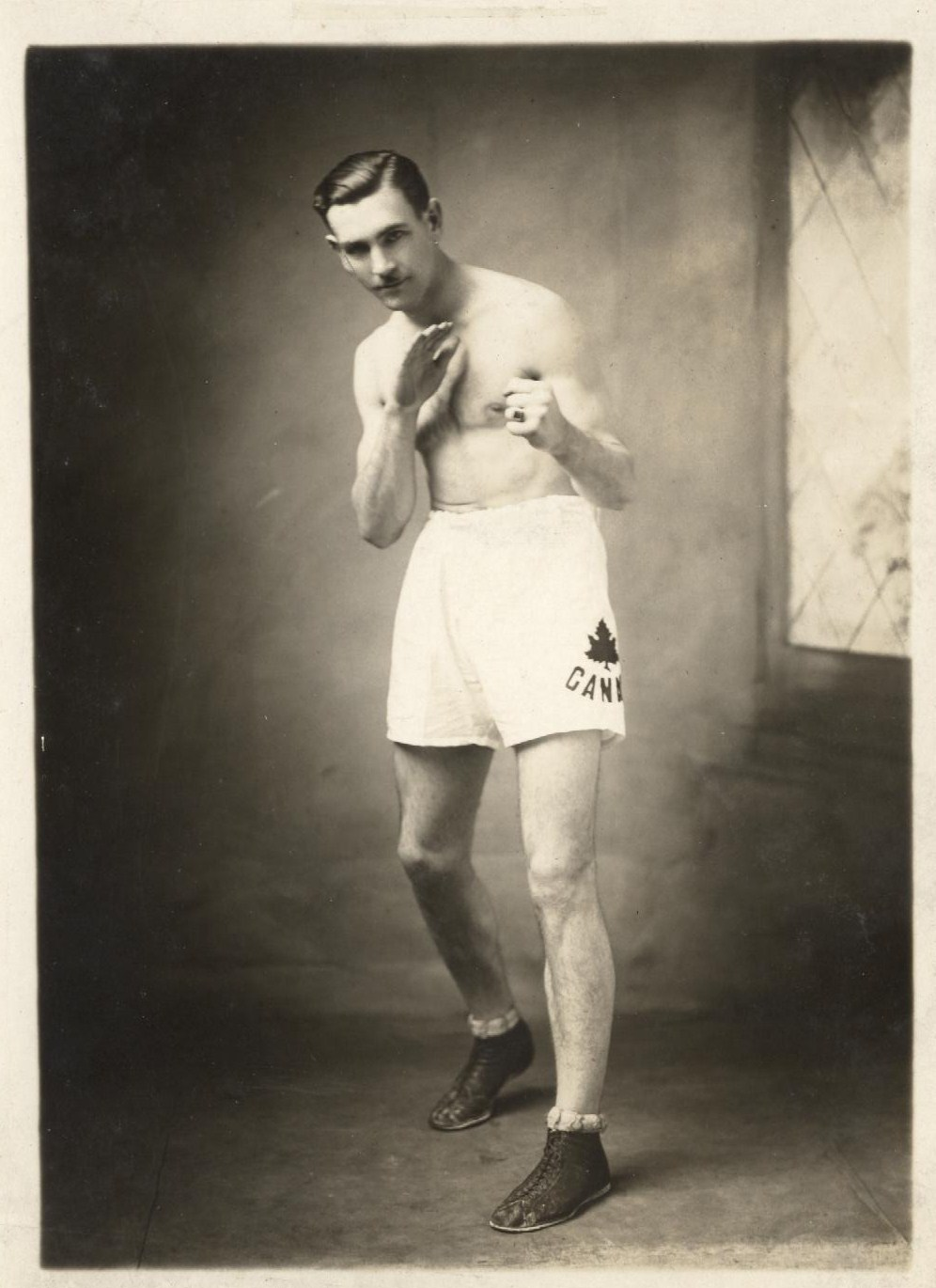
Ray Smillie

Ray Lewis Nelson Smillie (January 18, 1904 – April 21, 1993) was a Canadian boxer who competed in the 1928 Summer Olympics where he won the bronze medal in the welterweight class after winning the third place match against Robert Galataud.

Smillie came from an athletic family. As a member of the Toronto YMCA, he was an avid gymnast, competing in the high bar, pommel horse and tumbling events. As part of the Argonaut's junior rowing team, he held the bow position. And in 1919 he won the gold medal in the Ontario Swimming Championships in the twenty-yard sprint. He also played football, tennis and golf. Ray's next endeavour into sports was a very successful career in boxing. In 1925, his first competitive year, he won the Ontario Championships and then advanced to the National Championships where he again won gold.

His accomplishments include:

- 1925 Canadian Amateur Welterweight Boxing Champion
- Silver Medalist Pan-American match Boston Lion's Club Cup
- 1927 New England and Ontario Title
- 1928 Olympic trials in Montreal - qualified for the 1928 Summer Olympics in Amsterdam, the Netherlands
- 1928 Olympic Bronze Medalist Amsterdam Olympics
- Refereed over 2,000 fights throughout the 1930s
- Lieutenant Officer Canadian Navy, World War Two
- Founder of Sault Ste. Marie Naval Vets

Smillie was born in Toronto, Ontario to Sara Louise Winter and William Nelson Smillie. Smillie married Christina Fraser Carruthers in 1930. They had three children. His younger brother, Don Smillie, was also an athlete and played professional hockey for the Boston Bruins. Smillie died in Sault Ste Marie, Ontario in 1993.

== 1928 Olympic results ==
Below is the record of Raymond Smillie, a Canadian welterweight boxer who competed at the 1928 Amsterdam Olympics:

- Round of 32: Defeated Johann Fraberger (Austria) on points
- Round of 16: Defeated Patrick Lenehan (Ireland) on points
- Quarterfinal: Defeated Kintaro Usuda (Japan) on points
- Semifinal: Lost to Raul Landini (Argentina) on points
- Bronze-Medal Bout: Defeated Robert Galataud (France) on points
