= Matt Flanagan (boxer) =

Irish boxer (1897–1970)

Personal information
- Nationality: Irish
- Born: 31 May 1897; Coolree, Johnstown Bridge, Co. Kildare, Ireland
- Died: 3 March 1970 (aged 72)

Sport
- Sport: Boxing

Matthew Flanagan (31 May 1897 – 3 March 1970) was an Irish boxer. He competed in the men's heavyweight event at the 1928 Summer Olympics.

He won the 1931 ABA Heavyweight Championship. He was also the 1925 Irish Cruiserweight champion and Irish Heavyweight champion from 1926 to 1929, losing the title in 1930 and regaining it in 1931. For six years he was Ireland's undisputed champion and beat some of the best boxers in Europe and America.

He was a member of the Garda Síochána.
