= Michael Michaelsen =

Danish boxer (1899–1970)

Medal record

Men's Boxing

Representing Denmark

Olympic Games
Bronze medal – third place	1928 Amsterdam	Heavyweight

European Amateur Championships
Bronze medal – third place	1927 Berlin	Heavyweight

Michael Jacob Michaelsen (April 11, 1899 in Sundbyerne, Amager, Denmark – August 13, 1970 in Frederiksberg, Denmark) was a Danish boxer who competed in the 1928 Summer Olympics. He was Jewish.

In 1928 he won the bronze medal in the heavyweight class after winning the third-place fight against Sverre Sørsdal.

He participated in the 1927 European Amateur Boxing Championships winning the third place and again in the 1930 European Amateur Boxing Championships where Michaelsen became European champion defeating Sweden's Bertil Molander in the final.

== 1928 Olympic results ==
Below is the record of Michael Michaelsen, a Danish heavyweight boxer who competed at the 1928 Amsterdam Olympics:

- Round of 16: bye
- Quarterfinal: defeated Georges Gardebois (France) on points
- Semifinal: lost to Arturo Rodriguez (Argentina) on points
- Bronze-Medal Bout: defeated Sverre Sørsdal (Norway) by walkover (was awarded bronze medal)

== See also ==
- List of select Jewish boxers
