= Arturo Rodríguez (boxer) =

Argentine boxer and rugby union player

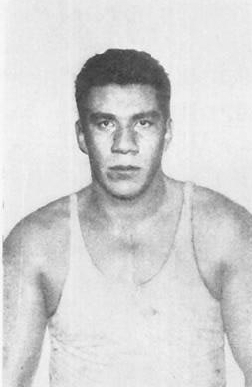

Medal record

Men's Boxing

Olympic Games
Gold medal – first place	1928 Amsterdam	Heavyweight

Arturo Jaime Rodríguez Jurado (nicknamed El Mono) (27 May 1907 – 22 November 1982) was an Argentine boxer and rugby union player. As a boxer, he competed at the 1924 and 1928 Summer Olympics. In 1924, he lost his first fight against Thyge Petersen and was eliminated in the first round of the light heavyweight class. In 1928 Rodríguez Jurado won the gold medal, after beating Nils Ramm in the heavy weight category. This was the first gold medal won by Argentina in boxing.

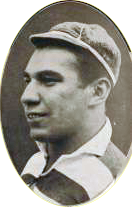
Rodríguez Jurado with the Argentina rugby union team in 1929

In rugby union, Rodríguez Jurado played for San Isidro Club, and was the Argentina national team captain.

His sons, Arturo, Jaime and Marcelo, also had notable careers as rugby players, and were called up for the national team as their father had been in the 1920s.

His nephew is Fernando Rodríguez.
