= Robert Galataud =

French boxer (1907–1978)

Robert Fernand Galataud
Personal information
- Nationality: French
- Born: 19 May 1907; Épernay, France
- Died: 7 November 1978 (aged 71); Épernay, France

Sport
- Sport: Boxing

Robert Galataud (19 May 1907 – 7 November 1978) was a French boxer. He competed in the men's welterweight event at the 1928 Summer Olympics.

== 1928 Olympic results ==
- Round of 32: bye
- Round of 16: defeated Frantisek Nekolny (Czechoslovakia) on points
- Quarterfinal: defeated Johan Hellstrom (Finland) on points
- Semifinal: lost to Ted Morgan (New Zealand) on points
- Bronze Medal Bout: lost to Raymond Smillie (Canada) on points
