= Nils Ramm =

Swedish boxer

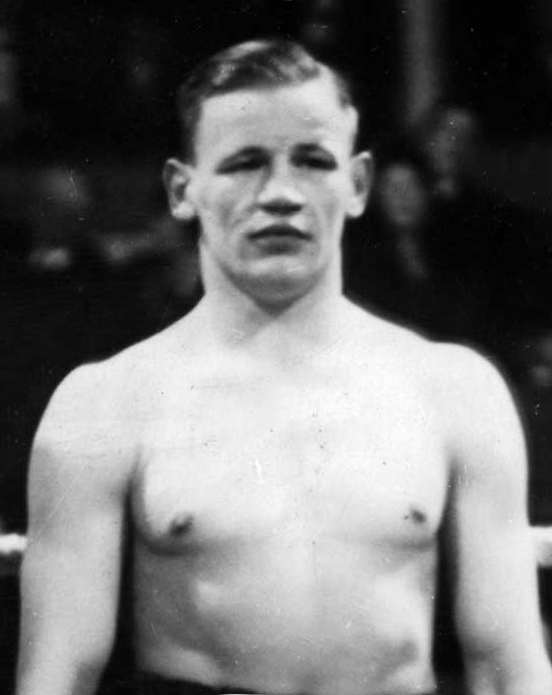

Personal information
- Full name: Nils Arvid Ramm
- Nationality: Sweden
- Born: 1 January 1903 Stockholm, Sweden
- Died: 8 November 1986 (aged 83) Linköping, Sweden

Sport
- Sport: Boxing
- Weight class: Heavyweight
- Club: Djurgårdens IF, Stockholm
Medal record
Men's amateur boxing
Representing Sweden
Olympic Games
Silver medal – second place	1928 Amsterdam	Heavyweight
European Amateur Championships
Gold medal – first place	1927 Berlin	Heavyweight
Silver medal – second place	1925 Stockholm	Light heavyweight

Nils Arvid Ramm (1 January 1903 – 8 November 1986) was a Swedish heavyweight boxer who won a silver medal at the 1928 Summer Olympics. Previously he won the 1927 European title and finished second in 1925. After the Olympics Ramm turned professional and had a record of 17 wins, 4 losses and one draw before retiring in 1931.

Ramm represented Djurgårdens IF.

== 1928 Olympic Results ==
Below are the results of Nils Ramm, a Swedish heavyweight boxer who competed at the 1928 Amsterdam Olympics:

- Round of 16: bye
- Quarterfinal: defeated Hans Schonrath (Germany) on points
- Semifinal: defeated Sverre Sorsdal (Norway) on points
- Final: lost to Arturo Rodriguez (Argentina) by first-round knockout (was awarded silver medal)
