= Ted Morgan (boxer) =

New Zealand boxer

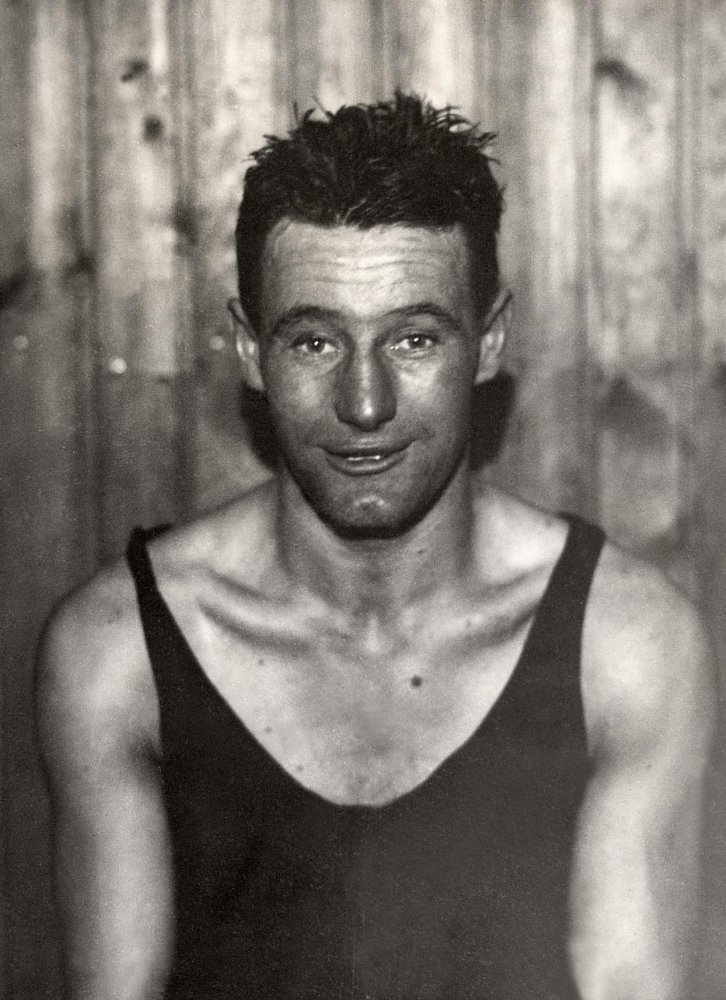
- Ted Morgan at the 1928 Olympics

Personal information
- Born: 5 April 1906 London, England
- Died: 22 November 1952 (aged 46) Wellington, New Zealand
- Height: 1.72 m (5 ft 8 in)
- Weight: 67 kg (148 lb)

Boxing career
- Reach: 80 in (203 cm)
- Stance: Southpaw

Boxing record
- Total fights: 26
- Wins: 13
- Losses: 11
- Draws: 2
Medal record
Representing New Zealand
Olympic Games
Gold medal – first place	1928 Amsterdam	Welterweight

Edward "Ted" Morgan (5 April 1906 – 22 November 1952) was a New Zealand boxer. He won the gold medal in the welterweight division at the 1928 Summer Olympics, despite competing throughout the tournament with a dislocated knuckle in his left hand. This was the first gold medal won for an athlete representing New Zealand.

== 1928 Olympics ==
Tim Tracey had been training Morgan in the build up for the 1928 Olympic games in Amsterdam. Unfortunately, due to the elongated travel times athletes from NZ faced in attending the Olympics, Morgan put on weight. He was three pounds over the lightweight division limit and therefore had to fight up in the welterweight grade; often giving up to 9 pounds away to his opponents. Leading up to the games he dislocated his knuckle on his left hand sparring with European professional Ernie Rice. Morgan was a southpaw which caused even greater problems. Morgan was regarded by many as one of the best fighters at the games, despite throwing very few left handed punches.

=== 1928 Olympic tournament results ===
- Round of 16: defeated Selfrid Johansson (Sweden) by a second-round knockout
- Quarterfinal: defeated Romano Caneva (Italy) by decision
- Semifinal: defeated Robert Galataud (France) by decision
- Final: defeated Raul Landini (Argentina) by decision (won gold medal)

== Background ==
Morgan was born in London, England, but his family moved to New Zealand when he was one year old. There he attended Te Aro School and Wellington College, but dropped out in 1922 and started working as a plumber. A plaque at Wellington College was erected in his honor.

Morgan was the New Zealand Amateur Lightweight Champion in 1925 and 1927. He won 26 out of his 28 amateur bouts. In July 1929 he turned professional, but with a little success, winning 13 and losing 11 out of 26 bouts. In 1931 he won three minor matches in the United States and the New Zealand welterweight title, knocking out Reg Trowern in second round. He retired in October 1934 after losing to Don Stirling in a welterweight title fight and later worked as a plumber and boxing referee. Morgan was offered the chance to turn pro after the Olympics but turned it down. He later regretted the decision saying he needed to have turned pro overseas where the "game was bigger". Morgan's gold medal is one of the biggest examples of overcoming adversity and is one of the least well known NZ Olympic stories.

== Family ==
On 12 April 1933 he married sprinter Norma Wilson, who also competed at the 1928 Olympics, but they divorced in 1938. Morgan remarried on 10 November 1945, to Jannet Elizabeth Reynolds; they had a son and a daughter.

== Death ==
Although he was a non-smoker, Morgan died from lung cancer in Wellington due to the inhalation of fumes while working as a plumber. In 1990 he was inducted into the New Zealand Sports Hall of Fame.
