= Deaths in July 1990 =

The following is a list of notable deaths in July 1990.

Entries for each day are listed alphabetically by surname. A typical entry lists information in the following sequence:

- Name, age, country of citizenship at birth, subsequent country of citizenship (if applicable), reason for notability, cause of death (if known), and reference.

== July 1990 ==
=== 1 ===
- Carl Christiansen, 81, Norwegian Olympic rower (1936).
- Pat Field, 79, Australian politician, suicide.
- Paul Gondjout, 78, Gabonese politician.
- Lorrie Hunter, 90, New Zealand politician.
- Arthur Lovett, 70, Australian cricketer.
- Anna Palk, 48, English actress, cancer.
- Eric M. Rogers, 87, British physicist.
- Jurriaan Schrofer, 64, Dutch artist.
- Ivan Serov, 84, Russian intelligence officer, head of the KGB (1954–1958).
- Willem Winkelman, 102, Dutch Olympic track and field athlete (1908).

=== 2 ===
- Silvina Bullrich, 74, Argentine novelist, lung cancer.
- Bert Connelly, 81, Canadian ice hockey player (New York Rangers, Chicago Black Hawks).
- Ludwig Franz, 67, German politician.
- Marion Rice Hart, 98, American athlete.
- Snooky Lanson, 76, American singer and television personality.
- Mildred Scott Olmsted, 99, American peace activist.

=== 3 ===
- Armand Apell, 85, French Olympic boxer (1928).
- Bodheswaran, 88, Indian poet.
- Maurice Girodias, 71, French publisher, heart attack.
- Potsy Jones, 80, American football player (Frankford Yellow Jackets, New York Giants, Green Bay Packers).
- Vic Olsson, 86, New Zealand rower.

=== 4 ===
- Phil Boggs, 40, American Olympic diver (1976), lymphoma.
- Olive Ann Burns, 65, American novelist, heart failure.
- Tom Campbell, 65, Australian rules footballer.
- Beverly Grant, 53, American actress, cancer.
- Marshall Hall, 79, American mathematician.
- Lloyd Jones, 84, Australian rules footballer.
- Loyal Oakley, 91, Australian rules footballer.
- Sweeney Schriner, 78, Russian-born Canadian ice hockey player (New York Americans, Toronto Maple Leafs).
- Willi Soya, 54, German footballer.
- Ernst Wister, 68, Austrian Olympic gymnast (1948, 1952).
- Nathaniel Wyeth, 78, American engineer and inventor.

=== 5 ===
- Edith Bülbring, 86, German-English physiologist.
- Tom Curran, 79, American Olympic rower (1936).
- Eugene Guth, 84, Austrian-American physicist.
- Ted Hoppen, 72, Australian rules footballer.
- Thistle Yolette Harris, 87, Australian botanist.
- Hellmut Wilhelm, 84, German-American Sinologist.

=== 6 ===
- William R. Higgins, 45, American colonel, torture murder. (death declared on this date).
- Alfred Maasik, 93, Estonian-American Olympic runner (1932).
- Georg Schmidt, 63, Austrian football manager.
- Angel Zamarripa, 77, Mexican artist, kidney failure.
- Ryoko Ishida, 15, Japanese student, severe injuries to the head.

=== 7 ===
- Don Bessent, 59, American baseball player (Brooklyn/Los Angeles Dodgers, alcohol poisoning.
- Cazuza, 32, Brazilian musician, AIDS.
- Ben Ciccone, 80, American NFL player (Pittsburgh Pirates, Chicago Cardinals).
- Bill Cullen, 70, American television personality (I've Got a Secret), lung cancer.
- Hugo Enomiya-Lassalle, 91, German interfaith priest.
- Pu Laldenga, 63, Indian politician, lung cancer.
- Ingy Norman, 79, Australian rules footballer.
- Tommy Pool, 55, American Olympic sport shooter (1964).

=== 8 ===
- Joe Appiah, 71, Ghanaian lawyer, politician and statesman.
- Albert Barnes, 77, Welsh Olympic boxer (1936).
- Richard Barry Bernstein, 66, American physical chemist, heart attack.
- Ivan Black, 77, Australian politician.
- R. R. M. Carpenter, Jr., 74, American baseball executive, cancer.
- Amélia Rey Colaço, 92, Portuguese actor.
- Howard Duff, 76, American actor, heart attack.
- Hans Faverey, 56, Dutch poet.
- John Galbally, 79, Australian politician, Alzheimer's disease.
- Malcolm Hilton, 61, English cricketer.
- Robert Murzeau, 81, French actor.
- Aage Stentoft, 76, Danish composer.
- George Edward Wheeler, 75, American Olympic gymnast (1936).
- David Widder, 92, American mathematician.

=== 9 ===
- Hélène Boschi, 72, Swiss-French pianist.
- René Chanas, 76, French film director, screenwriter, and film producer.
- Sonny Dunham, 78, American trumpeter, cancer.
- Hertha Feist, 94, German expressionist dancer and choreographer.
- Vernon Simeon Plemion Grant, 88, American illustrator.
- Maire Gullichsen, 83, Finnish art collector.
- Emile Nurenberg, 71, Luxembourgian Olympic footballer (1948).
- Ragnar Olsen, 76, Norwegian Olympic racewalker (1952).
- Horst Rittel, 59, German design theorist.
- Eric M. Warburg, 90, German banker.
- Friedrich Wegener, 83, German pathologist.

=== 10 ===
- Alain Chapel, 52, French chef, stroke.
- Henry Coppola, 77, American baseball player (Washington Senators).
- Vidya Dhar Mahajan, 77, Indian historian and political scientist.
- Donald McGavran, 92, Indian-American missiologist.
- Sergei Rudenko, 85, Soviet general.
- Alfred Ryan, 86, Australian footballer and cricket player.
- Sandor Szoke, 62, Hungarian-born Australian Olympic fencer (1956).

=== 11 ===
- Ignacio Aguirre, 89, Mexican painter and engraver.
- Steve Rabinovitch, 47, Canadian Olympic swimmer (1960).
- Earl Stewart, 68, American golfer.
- George Watts, 75, American football player (Washington Redskins).
- Sun Yu, 90, Chinese film director.

=== 12 ===
- Bill Burrud, 65, American child actor and television host, heart attack.
- Yang Chin-hu, 91, Taiwanese politician.
- Savkuz Dzarasov, 60, Soviet wrestler and Olympic medalist (1960).
- Joan Whitney Kramer, 76, American musician, Alzheimer's disease.
- Paul Reps, 94, American poet.
- João Saldanha, 73, Brazilian football coach.

=== 13 ===
- Alaattin Baydar, 88-89, Turkish Olympic footballer (1924, 1928).
- George L. Mabry Jr., 72, American general, Medal of Honor recipient, prostate cancer.
- Lois Moran, 81, American actress, cancer.
- Laura Perls, 84, German psychologist.
- Harry Seltzer, 71, American football player (Detroit Lions).

=== 14 ===
- Jean Dauven, 89, French Olympic bobsledder (1936).
- Manuel Cárdenas Espitia, 29, Colombian racing cyclist.
- Ralph Humphrey, 58, American painter.
- Philip Leacock, 72, English filmmaker.
- Diego Ordóñez, 86, Spanish Olympic sprinter (1920, 1924, 1928).
- Walter Sedlmayr, 64, German actor, murdered.

=== 15 ===
- Oleg Kagan, 43, Soviet violinist, cancer.
- Poul Larsen, 73, Danish canoeist and Olympian (1936).
- Alison Leggatt, 86, English actress.
- Margaret Lockwood, 73, English actress, cirrhosis.
- Alexandre Pawlisiak, 77, French racing cyclist.
- Luigi Rigamonti, 70, Italian Olympic wrestler (1948).
- Omar Abu Risha, 80, Syrian diplomat and poet.
- Enn Roos, 81, Soviet sculptor.
- Trouble T Roy, 22, American hip hop dancer, injuries sustained from a fall.
- Bud Thackery, 87, American cinematographer.
- Zaim Topčić, 70, Yugoslav novelist.
- Joe Ungerer, 73, American football player (Washington Redskins).
- Wilhelm Vorwerg, 90, German actor and art director.

=== 16 ===
- Tomás Blanco, 79, Spanish actor.
- Ibrahim Dadashov, 64, Soviet Azerbaijani Olympic wrestler (1952).
- Mogens Fog, 86, Danish politician.
- Mikhail Matusovsky, 74, Soviet poet.
- Miguel Muñoz, 68, Spanish footballer, internal bleeding.
- Valentin Pikul, 62, Soviet novelist, heart attack.
- Sidney Torch, 82, British musician, suicide by drug overdose.

=== 17 ===
- Bernard Cowan, 68, Canadian actor and television producer.
- Lidiya Ginzburg, 88, Soviet literary critic.
- Guglielmo Giovannini, 64, Italian Olympic footballer (1948).
- Wilf Grant, 69, English footballer.
- Edward A. Murphy, Jr., 72, American aerospace engineer, namesake of Murphy's law.
- Arnold Quick, 75, English cricketer.

=== 18 ===
- Gerry Boulet, 44, Canadian singer, cancer.
- Štefan Čambal, 81, Czechoslovak football player.
- Georges Carcagne, 82, French Olympic boxer (1928).
- Yves Chaland, 33, French cartoonist, traffic collision.
- André Chastel, 77, French art historian.
- Georges Dargaud, 79, French publisher.
- Roy Fagan, 84, Australian politician.
- Karl Menninger, 96, American psychiatrist, abdominal cancer.
- Ilse Meudtner, 77, German Olympic diver (1928).
- Aatto Nuora, 94, Finnish Olympic sports shooter (1936).
- Yun Po-sun, 92, South Korean politician, president (1960–1962), diabetes.
- Johnny Wayne, 72, Canadian comedian, brain cancer.

=== 19 ===
- Egil Aarvik, 77, Norwegian politician.
- Helmut Becker, 63, German viticulturist.
- Georgi Burkov, 57, Soviet actor, thrombosis.
- Børge Hylle, 64, Danish footballer.
- Daniel du Janerand, 71, French painter, muralist, and book illustrator.
- Gusman Kosanov, 55, Soviet Olympic sprinter (1960, 1964), suicide.
- Allan Opsahl, 65, American Olympic ice hockey player (1948).
- Eddie Quillan, 83, American actor, cancer.

=== 20 ===
- Carlo Cavagnoli, 83, Italian Olympic boxer (1928).
- Auguste Denise, 84, Ivorian politician and Head of state.
- Wilbert Labeaux, 75, American baseball player.
- Sergei Parajanov, 66, Soviet filmmaker, cancer.
- Viktoras Ražaitis, 82, Lithuanian Olympic javelin thrower (1928).
- Klara Sierońska-Kostrzewa, 76, Polish Olympic gymnast (1936).
- Bruno Splieth, 73, German Olympic sailor (1960, 1964).

=== 21 ===
- Heitor Canalli, 80, Brazilian football player.
- Owen DeVol Cox, 80, American district judge (United States District Court for the Southern District of Texas).
- Sacha Pitoëff, 70, Swiss actor.
- Stanley Shapiro, 65, American screenwriter.
- P. R. Shyamala, 59, Indian novelist.
- Albert Strange, 85, Australian rules footballer.
- Joe Turner, 82, American pianist, heart attack.
- Rich Vogler, 39, American racing driver, racing collision.

=== 22 ===
- Ray Mawby, 68, British politician.
- Preben Neergaard, 70, Danish actor.
- Manuel Puig, 57, Argentine novelist, heart attack.
- Eduard Streltsov, 53, Soviet footballer and Olympian (1956), laryngeal cancer.

=== 23 ===
- Otto Ambros, 89, German chemist and war criminal during World War II.
- Georges Flamant, 86, French film actor.
- Pierre Gandon, 91, French illustrator and engraver.
- James D. Hart, 79, American literary scholar, brain cancer.
- Maxwell Newton, 61, Australian publisher.
- Herbert Oehmichen, 74, American Olympic handball player (1936).
- Norm Simpson, 85, Australian rules footballer.
- Bert Sommer, 41, American singer and actor, respiratory illness.
- Kenjiro Takayanagi, 91, Japanese engineer and television pioneer, pneumonia.

=== 24 ===
- Michel Beaune, 56, French actor, cancer.
- Alan John Clarke, 54, English filmmaker, lung cancer.
- Coen Dillen, 63, Dutch football player, heart attack.
- Pasquale Fornara, 65, Italian racing cyclist.
- Freddie Tavares, 77, American designer, engineer, and musician.
- Arno Arthur Wachmann, 88, German astronomer.
- Andy Woehr, 94, American baseball player (Philadelphia Phillies).

=== 25 ===
- Jean Fourastié, 83, French civil servant, economist, and intellectual.
- Winefreda Geonzon, 48, Filipino lawyer, cancer.
- Sam Grainger, 60, American comic book artist (Marvel Comics).
- Kashim Ibrahim, 80, Nigerian politician.
- Jim Jewitt, 57, Australian rules footballer.
- Alfredo Pián, 77, Argentine racing driver.
- Manuel Sagarzazu, 86, Spanish Olympic footballer (1928).
- Paul Shannon, 80, American radio and television announcer, brain cancer.
- Kuzman Sotirović, 81, Yugoslav footballer and Olympian (1928).

=== 26 ===
- Leo Duyndam, 42, Dutch road bicycle racer, heart attack.
- Brent Mydland, 37, American keyboardist (The Grateful Dead), drug overdose.
- Albert Rose, 80, American physicist, lung cancer.
- Giorgio Scarlatti, 68, Italian racing driver.
- John Sylvester, 85-86, American naval admiral.

=== 27 ===
- Elizabeth Allan, 80, English actress.
- Ernest Archer, 80, British art director.
- Bobby Day, 62, American singer ("Rockin' Robin"), prostate cancer.
- Jimmy De Sana, 40, American artist, AIDS.
- Ed Emshwiller, 65, American visual artist, cancer.
- Maxine Gates, 73, American actress, respiratory failure.
- René Toribio, 77, Guadeloupean politician.

=== 28 ===
- Red Barrett, 75, American baseball player (Cincinnati Reds, Boston Braves, St. Louis Cardinals).
- Maurice Braddell, 89, English actor and author.
- Jill Esmond, 82, English actress.
- Lancelot Layne, Trinidad and Tobago musician.

=== 29 ===
- Maceo Clark, 93, American baseball player.
- Cliff Colling, 77, Australian rules footballer.
- Georges Conchon, 65, French writer.
- Herbert O. Fisher, 81, American aviation executive, heart failure.
- Bruno Kreisky, 79, Austrian politician, chancellor (1970–1983), heart failure.
- Cai Qiao, 92, Chinese physiologist and physician.
- Arthur Samuel, 88, American computer scientist.

=== 30 ===
- Victor Cavendish-Bentinck, 9th Duke of Portland, 93, British diplomat.
- Launcelot Fleming, 83, British Anglican prelate.
- Ian Gow, 53, British politician, car bombing.
- Gustaf Jonsson, 87, Swedish Olympic skier (1928, 1932).
- Durval Lima, 82, Brazilian Olympic rower (1932).
- Markus Schurch, 82, Swiss Olympic sailor (1952).
- Karl Weber, 74, American actor, heart failure.

=== 31 ===
- Lowell Davidson, 48, American pianist, tuberculosis.
- Nicolae Giosan, 68, Romanian agricultural engineer and politician.
- Albert Leduc, 87, Canadian ice hockey player.
- Wally Milne, 79, Australian rules footballer.
- Wilhelm Nowack, 92, German economist and politician.
- Lovro Radonjić, 62, Yugoslav water polo player and Olympic medalist (1952, 1956, 1960).
- Fernando Sancho, 74, Spanish actor, pancreatic cancer.
- Ludger Westrick, 95, German politician.
