= Antal Kocsis =

Hungarian boxer (1905–1994)

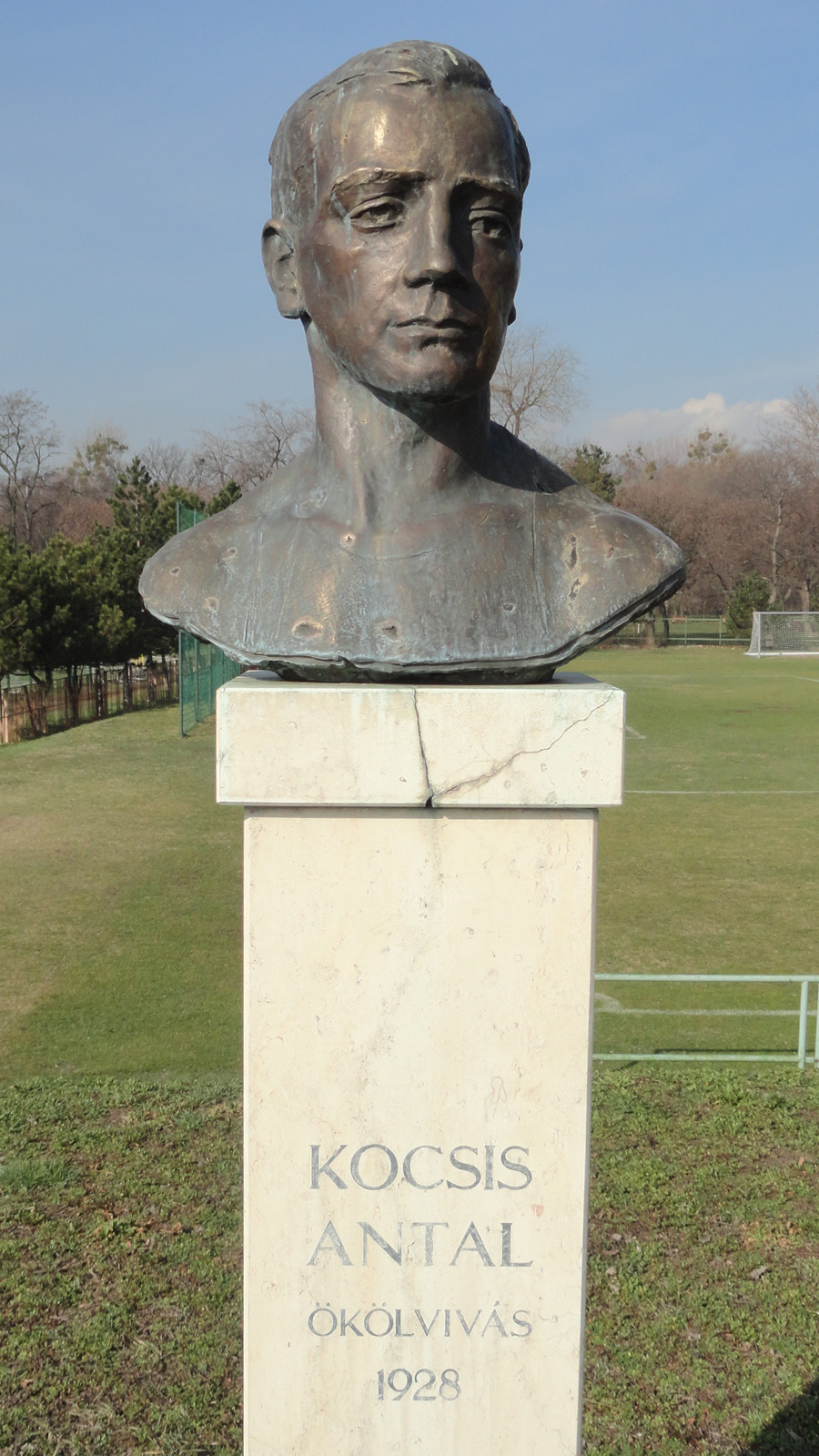

Medal record

Men's amateur boxing

Representing Hungary

Olympic Games
Gold medal – first place	1928 Amsterdam	Flyweight

European Amateur Championships
Silver medal – second place	1927 Berlin	Flyweight

Antal Kocsis (17 November 1905 – 25 October 1994) was a Hungarian boxer who competed in the 1928 Summer Olympics. In 1928 he won the gold medal in the flyweight class after winning the final against Armand Apell of France. He was born in Budapest-Kispest and died in Titusville, United States. His character plays a small but memorable role in Vilmos Kondor's 2012 novel Budapest Noir.

== Olympic results ==
- Round of 32: bye
- Round of 16: José Villanova (Spain) points
- Quarterfinal: Defeated Hubert Ausböck (Germany) points
- Semifinal: Defeated Carlo Cavagnoli (Italy) points
- Final: Defeated Armand Apell (France) points (won gold medal)
