= José Turra =

Chilean boxer

Personal information
- Nationality: Chilean
- Born: 3 March 1912 (age 114)

Sport
- Sport: Boxing

José Turra (born 3 March 1912, date of death unknown) was a Chilean boxer. He competed in the men's flyweight event at the 1928 Summer Olympics. At the 1928 Summer Olympics, he lost to Nikolaos Fexis of Greece. Turra is deceased.
