= Olav Nielsen =

Norwegian boxer

Olav Nielsen (5 April 1902 – 25 April 1944) was a Norwegian amateur boxer who competed in the 1928 Summer Olympics.

He was born and died in Oslo, and represented the sports club SK av 1909. He tied for ninth in the flyweight division in the boxing at the 1928 Summer Olympics.

In 1928 he was eliminated in the second round of the flyweight class after losing his fight to Baddie Lebanon.

== 1928 Olympic results ==
Below is the record of Olav Nielsen, a Norwegian flyweight boxer who competed at the 1928 Amsterdam Olympics:

- Round of 32: bye
- Round of 16: lost to Baddie Lebanon (South Africa) by decision
