= Joe Glick =

American boxer (1903–1978)

Personal information
- Born: February 22, 1903 Brooklyn, New York, U.S.
- Died: September 5, 1978 (aged 75) Los Angeles, California, U.S.
- Height: 5 ft 8 in (1.73 m)
- Weight: Junior Lightweight; Lightweight

Boxing career
- Stance: Orthodox

Boxing record
- Total fights: 245
- Wins: 136
- Win by KO: 25
- Losses: 72
- Draws: 32
- No contests: 5

Joe Glick (February 22, 1903 – September 5, 1978) was an American professional boxer from Brooklyn who established himself early as a top contender among junior lightweights. He had two junior lightweight title shots against Tod Morgan in 1926–27, but was unable to take the championship. Moving up in weight class, he also excelled as a lightweight. His long career spanned twenty-three years and included over two hundred verified bouts.

== Early boxing career ==
Joe Glick was born in the Williamsburg area of Brooklyn, on February 22, 1903, and began training as a boxer in his teens. He worked as a tailor prior to his boxing career.

Barely eighteen in 1921, he won nine of his first eleven fights in the Brooklyn area, showing exceptional promise at an early age. Six of his first eleven wins were won by knockout. He lost only two of his better publicized fights in 1922, setting an exceptional early fight record. On January 26, 1923, he was knocked out by Petey Hayes at the 9th Coast Defense Armory in New York, but did not incur another loss until June 9, 1923, against Jimmy Hutchinson. He had only two additional losses in 1923, as the quality of his competition continued to steadily improve.

== Boxing career as jr. lightweight contender and top lightweight ==
At 23, in a ten-round bout on January 29, 1926, Glick defeated Johnny Dundee, the former 1923 Featherweight and Junior Lightweight champion who was nearing the end of an exceptional career. According to the Milwaukee Sentinel, the rising Glick was a 2–1 favorite against Dundee, who, despite his reputation, had been retired from the ring for six months prior to his bout with Glick. Partly as a result of this win, Glick was matched with Tod Morgan, Junior Lightweight Champion on September 30 of that year and was decisively defeated in his first fifteen-round title shot in Madison Square Garden. According to the Associated Press, Glick took only one round of the fifteen-round match.

=== Close match with Jr. Lightweight Champion Tod Morgan ===
In a second World Junior Lightweight Title on December 16, 1927, Glick fared better against Morgan in a controversial match. Glick lost the bout as a result of punching Morgan below the belt in the fourteenth round. At least one source, Oregon's Bend Bulletin wrote that for each of the three times Morgan was down on the canvas, "it was from a questionable body blow which was struck near the foul line." The Bulletin also noted that the "9000 fans started yelling low blow as early as the second round". Glick dropped Morgan for nine counts once in the second and twice in the fifth, and may have won the bout had he not been disqualified for a low left to the groin in the fourteenth by referee Eddie Forbes. Morgan was hurt by loops to the head, often to the jaw, and digs to the body at several points in the bout. Glick began the first with a strong and effective attack against Morgan. Glick was first warned of a low blow in the third round, and had lost previous fights to low blows. Though he was ahead on points prior to the foul, Glick subsequently lost his second chance at the Junior Lightweight title. He would never get a third opportunity.

In between these two bouts with Morgan between January 1926 and December 1927, Glick stayed busy fighting exceptional boxers including Benny Bass and Jack Bernstein. Future Boxing Hall of Fame recipient Bass would at one time hold both the World Jr. Lightweight and Featherweight Title. Bernstein had briefly taken the World Jr. Lightweight Title on May 30, 1923, at the Coney Island Velodrome against Johnny Dundee. Glick was unable to beat Bass in his three meetings, but did obtain one no decision. Shortly before his second bout with Morgan, he defeated Bernstein in a widely attended ten-round match on November 14, 1927, at Madison Square Garden.

=== Brief boxing suspension and bout with Baby Joe Gans ===
Oddly, Glick was suspended for a full year from boxing by the Philadelphia Boxing Commission for stalling during his bout with Al Gordon in Philadelphia on February 13, 1928. The suspension applied only to Philadelphia, and Glick fought extensively in New York and New Jersey the remainder of the year, meeting elite lightweights. On November 16, 1928, in one of his most well attended bouts, Glick met Baby Joe Gans in Madison Square Garden in New York before a crowd of nearly 19,000. The United Press expressed distaste in the quality of the match, though the local New York Times was quite impressed with the quality of Glick's fighting, and the crowd ardently supported the ten round points decision in favor of Glick, the New York native.

After the zenith of his early career as a Junior Lightweight in January 1929, Tex Ricard, manager for Jack Dempsey, still rated Glick third among top Lightweights in America.

=== Exciting bouts with Champions Jimmy McLarnin, Kid Kaplan, Jack "Kid" Berg, and Tony Canzoneri ===
In January and March 1929, Glick faced the exceptional Jimmy McLarnin, a former Lightweight champion, but lost to him in both bouts. Glick's first bout with McLarnin in Madison Square Garden on January 11, garnered large attendance, and though Glick lost the ten round bout by unanimous decision, McLarnin's nose was broken in the bout. His second bout with McLarnin in the Garden on March 1, attended by nearly 19,000, ended when Glick was knocked out in the second round.

Glick also lost to Louis "Kid Kaplan," former Featherweight champion, in April 1929. In 1930, Glick fought Tony Canzoneri, former World Featherweight champion, and hall of famer Jackie "Kid" Berg, Featherweight World Champion from 1930 to 1931. Canzoneri beat Glick in a ten-round decision, taking the lightweight title later that year. Berg would defeat Glick in two decisions that year.

By 1933, Glick's career began to wane, and though he continued to box talented boxers, he lost a number of his bouts, with some by knockout. In 1933–35, he lost twelve well publicized bouts. On September 1, 1934, he was knocked out by Ceferino Garcia, a 1939 World Middleweight champion in only the second round of a ten-round match in Pismo Beach, California. On October 26, 1934, he was knocked out in less than a minute by Freddie Steele in Yakima, Washington. During this period, Glick had begun to appear as a movie extra in the Los Angeles area.

== Movie career after professional boxing ==
Near the end of his professional boxing career around 1933, Glick moved to Los Angeles and appeared in a number of films, primarily as an extra, often appearing in the movie's credits. In 1933, Glick appeared briefly on screen in 20th Century Pictures' The Bowery. In this rough slice-of-life movie set in the New York Bowery in the East end of Manhattan in the 1890s, several of the characters played thugs or boxers. The film starred actors Wallace Beery and Fay Ray, and Glick appeared with ex-Middleweight World Champion Al McCoy, as well as boxers Jim Flynn, Phil Bloom, Frank Moran, British boxer William Thomas, known as "Kid Broad," Jack Herrick and Abe Hollandersky. The boxing extras were well cast. Bloom, Flynn, Moran, and Hollandersky had all boxed frequently in New York, and several had lived there.

Glick also appeared briefly in the 1933 Paramount Productions's, Tillie and Gus, an adventure film about the purchase of a ferry boat, the Fairy Queen.

Another rough slice-of-life movie in which Glick appeared was the black and white 1934 Paramount Productions's film, LimeHouse Blues. Not atypical of the movies in which ex-boxers found roles, the film depicted rough street life. It was set in London's LimeHouse Causeway, a riverfront slum, and the main character, Harry Young ran a smuggling business out of his club.

In 1938, Glick played an extra in MGM's The Crowd Roars. In this successful boxing movie with Robert Taylor as the lead, Glick briefly appeared in a background gymnasium scene with boxers Larry Williams, Maxie Rosenbloom, Jimmy McLarnin, Abie Bain, Frankie Grandetta, Jack Roper, Tommy Herman, Larry Williams, and Abe "The Newsboy" Hollandersky.

Glick also played a small role in Imperial Pictures', May 1957 release of Monkey on My Back, which often included the subtitle The Barney Ross Story. Loosely based on the life of Lightweight, Junior Welterweight, and Welterweight boxing Champion Barney Ross, the film cast Ross as the character Cameron Mitchell in a major role. His real life cornerman Art Winch was played by Richard Benedict. Boxers appearing in the movie included Ceferina Garcia, who both Ross and Glick had boxed with painful results, Joe La Barba, and Tommy Herman. Though the only film ever made about the triple world title holder and recipient of the Silver star, it was a disappointment to Ross and his family who felt it sensationalized Ross's drug addiction.

Glick died on September 5, 1978, in Woodland Hills, a suburb of Los Angeles, California.

== Professional boxing record ==
All information in this section is derived from BoxRec, unless otherwise stated.

=== Official record ===
245 fights	129 wins	68 losses
By knockout	25	10
By decision	100	53
By disqualification	4	5
Draws	32	
No contests	5	
Newspaper decisions/draws	11	

All newspaper decisions are officially regarded as "no decision" bouts and are not counted in the win/loss/draw column.

No.	Result	Record	Opponent	Type	Round, time	Date	Location	Notes
245	Loss	129–68–32 (16)	Freddie Steele	KO	1 (10)	Oct 26, 1934	Armory, Yakima, Washington, US	
244	Loss	129–67–32 (16)	Ceferino Garcia	KO	2 (10)	Sep 1, 1934	Pismo Beach Arena, Pismo Beach, California, US	
243	Loss	129–66–32 (16)	Baby Joe Gans	PTS	10	Jul 3, 1934	Colorado Springs, Colorado, US	
242	Loss	129–65–32 (16)	Willard Brown	TKO	7 (10)	Jun 4, 1934	Coliseum Arena, New Orleans, Louisiana, US	
241	Loss	129–64–32 (16)	Johnny Hanlon	PTS	10	Apr 30, 1934	North Street Rink, Salem, Massachusetts, US	
240	Loss	129–63–32 (16)	Pat Igo	PTS	8	Apr 24, 1934	Charlton's Hall, Pottsville, Pennsylvania, US	
239	Loss	129–62–32 (16)	Elmer Bezenah	NWS	12	Apr 20, 1934	Exposition Building, Portland, Maine, US	
238	Loss	129–62–32 (15)	Harry Serody	TKO	9 (10)	Apr 9, 1934	Arena, Philadelphia, Pennsylvania, US	
237	Loss	129–61–32 (15)	George Gibbs	PTS	8	Apr 6, 1934	Waltz Dream Arena, Atlantic City, New Jersey, US	
236	Win	129–60–32 (15)	'Young' Patsy Wallace	PTS	8	Mar 23, 1934	Waltz Dream Arena, Atlantic City, New Jersey, US	
235	Loss	128–60–32 (15)	Joe Rossi	PTS	10	Mar 21, 1934	Broadway Arena, New York City, New York, US	
234	Loss	128–59–32 (15)	Joey Speigal	PTS	6	Mar 12, 1934	Public Hall, Cleveland, Ohio, US	
233	Loss	128–58–32 (15)	Johnny Jadick	PTS	10	Jan 12, 1934	Cambria A.C., Philadelphia, Pennsylvania, US	
232	Draw	128–57–32 (15)	Eddie Dempsey	PTS	6	Jan 2, 1934	Arena, Syracuse, New York, US	
231	Draw	128–57–31 (15)	Gus Campbell	PTS	10	Nov 20, 1933	Newark, New Jersey, US	
230	Loss	128–57–30 (15)	Tony Falco	PTS	10	Nov 2, 1933	Broadway Arena, New York City, New York, US	
229	Loss	128–56–30 (15)	Tommy Corbett	PTS	10	Oct 13, 1933	International Arena, Kansas City, Missouri, US	
228	Loss	128–55–30 (15)	Tracy Cox	KO	6 (10)	Sep 28, 1933	Fox and Fox Arena, Fort Worth, Texas, US	
227	Loss	128–54–30 (15)	Freddie Steele	PTS	8	Jun 22, 1933	Natatorium Park, Spokane, Washington, US	
226	Loss	128–53–30 (15)	Swede Berglund	PTS	10	Jun 9, 1933	Coliseum, San Diego, California, US	
225	Draw	128–52–30 (15)	Alfredo Gaona	PTS	10	Apr 2, 1933	El Toreo de Cuatro Caminos, Mexico City, Mexico	
224	Win	128–52–29 (15)	Carlos Ramos	PTS	10	Mar 18, 1933	El Toreo de Cuatro Caminos, Mexico City, Mexico	
223	Win	127–52–29 (15)	Manuel Luna	KO	6 (10)	Mar 9, 1933	Mexico City, Mexico	
222	Loss	126–52–29 (15)	Kid Azteca	PTS	10	Feb 18, 1933	Arena Nacional, Mexico City, Mexico	
221	Draw	126–51–29 (15)	Sammy Santos	PTS	6	Jan 24, 1933	Crystal Pool, Seattle, Washington, US	
220	Loss	126–51–28 (15)	Young Corbett III	PTS	10	Dec 19, 1932	Exposition Auditorium, San Francisco, California, US	
219	Draw	126–50–28 (15)	Alfredo Gaona	PTS	10	Dec 12, 1932	Arena Nacional, Mexico City, Mexico	
218	Draw	126–50–27 (15)	Tommy King	PTS	10	Oct 14, 1932	Legion Stadium, Hollywood, California, US	
217	NC	126–50–26 (15)	Andy DiVodi	NC	7 (10)	Aug 5, 1932	Dreamland Auditorium, San Francisco, California, US	
216	Win	126–50–26 (14)	David Velasco	PTS	10	Jul 25, 1932	Wrigley Field, Los Angeles, California, US	
215	Win	125–50–26 (14)	Gaston LeCadre	PTS	10	Jun 13, 1932	Civic Auditorium, San Francisco, California, US	
214	Win	124–50–26 (14)	Jackie Purvis	PTS	10	Jun 3, 1932	Dreamland Auditorium, San Francisco, California, US	
213	Win	123–50–26 (14)	Paolo Villa	PTS	6	Feb 16, 1932	Elks Lodge 22, New York City, New York, US	
212	Draw	122–50–26 (14)	Vincent Hambright	PTS	8	Feb 1, 1932	Jamaica Arena, New York City, New York, US	
211	Draw	122–50–25 (14)	Eduardo Duarry	PTS	6	Jan 18, 1932	Jamaica Arena, New York City, New York, US	
210	Win	122–50–24 (14)	Willie Smith	PTS	10	Dec 7, 1931	Arena, Trenton, New Jersey, US	
209	Loss	121–50–24 (14)	Jimmy McNamara	PTS	8	Nov 10, 1931	Elks Lodge 22, New York City, New York, US	
208	Win	121–49–24 (14)	Jimmy Phillips	PTS	10	Oct 26, 1931	Laurel Garden, Newark, New Jersey, US	
207	Loss	120–49–24 (14)	Mike Payan	PTS	6	Oct 10, 1931	Ridgewood Grove, New York City, New York, US	
206	Loss	120–48–24 (14)	Andy Saviola	PTS	6	Sep 26, 1931	Ridgewood Grove, New York City, New York, US	
205	Win	120–47–24 (14)	Emil Rossi	PTS	8	Sep 8, 1931	Queensboro Stadium, New York City, New York, US	
204	Win	119–47–24 (14)	Meliton Aragon	PTS	6	Aug 28, 1931	Long Beach Stadium, Long Beach, New Jersey, US	
203	Win	118–47–24 (14)	Henry Perlick	PTS	8	Aug 14, 1931	Long Beach Stadium, Long Beach, New Jersey, US	
202	Win	117–47–24 (14)	Mike Sarko	PTS	8	Jul 22, 1931	Bronx Parkway Arena, White Plains, New York, US	
201	Win	116–47–24 (14)	Eddie Guida	PTS	6	Jun 26, 1931	Long Beach Stadium, Long Beach, New Jersey, US	
200	Draw	115–47–24 (14)	Johnny Hayes	PTS	10	Jun 3, 1931	Convention Hall, Atlantic City, New Jersey, US	
199	Win	115–47–23 (14)	Joe Americo	KO	2 (8), 1:35	May 22, 1931	Stauch's Arena, New York City, New York, US	
198	Loss	114–47–23 (14)	Billy Wallace	PTS	8	May 8, 1931	Equestrium, Cleveland, Ohio, US	
197	Draw	114–46–23 (14)	Phil Rafferty	PTS	10	May 4, 1931	St. Nicholas Arena, New York City, New York, US	
196	Win	114–46–22 (14)	Joe Lucero	PTS	10	Apr 10, 1931	Madison Square Garden, Phoenix, Arizona, US	
195	Loss	113–46–22 (14)	Billy Townsend	PTS	10	Mar 31, 1931	Olympic Auditorium, Los Angeles, California, US	
194	Win	113–45–22 (14)	Teddy Palacios	KO	4 (6)	Mar 6, 1931	Dreamland Auditorium, San Francisco, California, US	
193	Draw	112–45–22 (14)	Johnny Lamar	PTS	10	Feb 12, 1931	Memorial Auditorium, Sacramento, California, US	
192	Loss	112–45–21 (14)	Eddie Wolfe	PTS	8	Jan 22, 1931	Auditorium, Memphis, Tennessee, US	
191	Draw	112–44–21 (14)	Jackie Shupack	PTS	8	Dec 11, 1930	Armory, Paterson, New Jersey, US	
190	Loss	112–44–20 (14)	Tony Herrera	KO	7 (10)	Nov 17, 1930	Motor Square Garden, Pittsburgh, Pennsylvania, US	
189	Win	112–43–20 (14)	Henry Perlick	SD	10	Nov 3, 1930	Massey Hall, Toronto, Ontario, Canada	
188	Draw	111–43–20 (14)	Tony Herrera	PTS	10	Oct 6, 1930	Motor Square Garden, Pittsburgh, Pennsylvania, US	
187	Loss	111–43–19 (14)	Jack 'Kid' Berg	UD	10	Sep 18, 1930	Queensboro Stadium, New York City, New York, US	
186	Loss	111–42–19 (14)	Mickey Cohen	NWS	10	Sep 1, 1930	Kansas City, Missouri, US	Not to be confused with Mickey Cohen
185	Loss	111–42–19 (13)	Billy Townsend	UD	10	Aug 18, 1930	Arena Gardens, Toronto, Ontario, Canada	
184	Loss	111–41–19 (13)	Justo Suárez	PTS	10	Jul 17, 1930	Yankee Stadium, New York City, New City, US	
183	Loss	111–40–19 (13)	Johnny O'Keefe	PTS	10	Jun 26, 1930	Garfield, New Jersey, US	
182	Loss	111–39–19 (13)	Tony Canzoneri	PTS	10	Jun 4, 1930	Ebbets Field, New York City, New York, US	
181	Draw	111–38–19 (13)	Lud Abella	PTS	10	May 12, 1930	Laurel Garden, Newark, New Jersey, US	
180	Loss	111–38–18 (13)	Jack 'Kid' Berg	UD	10	Apr 4, 1930	Madison Square Garden, New York City, New York, US	For NBA and The Ring light welterweight titles
179	Win	111–37–18 (13)	Georgie Balduc	PTS	10	Mar 25, 1930	Broadway Arena, New York City, New York, US	
178	Win	110–37–18 (13)	Buster Brown	PTS	10	Mar 17, 1930	10th Regiment Armory, Baltimore, Maryland, US	
177	Win	109–37–18 (13)	Tony Lambert	PTS	10	Mar 10, 1930	Laurel Garden, Newark, New Jersey, US	
176	Win	108–37–18 (13)	Billy McMahon	PTS	10	Mar 3, 1930	St. Nicholas Arena, New York City, New York, US	
175	Win	107–37–18 (13)	Petey Mack	PTS	10	Feb 11, 1930	Broadway Arena, New York City, New York, US	
174	Win	106–37–18 (13)	Doc Snell	PTS	6	Jan 1, 1930	Greenwich Coliseum, Tacoma, Washington, US	
173	Loss	105–37–18 (13)	Tommy Grogan	PTS	10	Dec 6, 1929	Dreamland Auditorium, San Francisco, California, US	
172	Loss	105–36–18 (13)	Eddie Murdock	PTS	10	Nov 15, 1929	Legion Stadium, Hollywood, California, US	
171	Win	105–35–18 (13)	Frankie Stetson	PTS	10	Nov 4, 1929	State Armory, San Francisco, California, US	
170	Win	104–35–18 (13)	Frankie Stetson	PTS	10	Sep 30, 1929	State Armory, San Francisco, California, US	
169	Loss	103–35–18 (13)	Manuel Quintero	PTS	10	Jul 31, 1929	Ebbets Field, New York City, New York, US	
168	Win	103–34–18 (13)	Lope Tenorio	PTS	10	Jul 23, 1929	Queensboro Stadium, New York City, New York, US	
167	Loss	102–34–18 (13)	Billy Wallace	PTS	12	May 21, 1929	Public Hall, Cleveland, Ohio, US	
166	Win	102–33–18 (13)	Luis Vicentini	PTS	10	May 10, 1929	Madison Square Garden, New York City, New York, US	
165	Loss	101–33–18 (13)	Georgie Day	PTS	10	May 6, 1929	Arena, New Haven, Connecticut, US	
164	Loss	101–32–18 (13)	Louis 'Kid' Kaplan	PTS	10	Apr 2, 1929	Arena, New Haven, Connecticut, US	
163	Loss	101–31–18 (13)	Jimmy McLarnin	KO	2 (10), 1:37	Mar 1, 1929	Madison Square Garden, New York City, New York, US	
162	Loss	101–30–18 (13)	Jimmy McLarnin	UD	10	Jan 11, 1929	Madison Square Garden, New York City, New York, US	
161	Win	101–29–18 (13)	Petey Mack	PTS	10	Dec 17, 1928	Broadway Arena, New York City, New York, US	
160	Win	100–29–18 (13)	Baby Joe Gans	PTS	10	Nov 16, 1928	Madison Square Garden, New York City, New York, US	
159	Loss	99–29–18 (13)	'Cowboy' Eddie Anderson	PTS	10	Oct 26, 1928	City Auditorium, Omaha, Nebraska, US	
158	Win	99–28–18 (13)	Hubert Gillis	PTS	10	Oct 19, 1928	Olympia Stadium, Detroit, Michigan, US	
157	Win	98–28–18 (13)	Tommy Grogan	PTS	10	Oct 5, 1928	Madison Square Garden, New York City, New York, US	
156	Win	97–28–18 (13)	Jackie Shupack	PTS	8	Sep 11, 1928	Arena, Garfield, New Jersey, US	
155	Win	96–28–18 (13)	Frankie Fink	PTS	10	Sep 4, 1928	Dexter Park Arena, Woodhaven, New York City, New York, US	
154	Win	95–28–18 (13)	Lope Tenorio	PTS	10	Aug 21, 1928	Dexter Park Arena, Woodhaven, New York City, New York, US	
153	Win	94–28–18 (13)	Jose Garcia	KO	1 (10)	Aug 6, 1928	Dexter Park Arena, Woodhaven, New York City, New York, US	
152	Loss	93–28–18 (13)	Mike Dundee	PTS	10	Jun 20, 1928	Taylor Bowl, Newburgh Heights, Ohio, US	
151	Loss	93–27–18 (13)	Stanislaus Loayza	PTS	10	Jun 12, 1928	Queensboro Stadium, New York City, New York, US	
150	Draw	93–26–18 (13)	Carl Duane	PTS	10	May 29, 1928	Queensboro Stadium, New York City, New York, US	
149	Win	93–26–17 (13)	Lope Tenorio	PTS	10	May 4, 1928	Madison Square Garden, New York City, New York, US	
148	Win	92–26–17 (13)	Mike Dundee	PTS	12	Apr 9, 1928	Memorial Hall, Dayton, Ohio, US	
147	Win	91–26–17 (13)	Hubert Gillis	PTS	6	Mar 31, 1928	Ridgewood Grove, New York City, New York, US	
146	Win	90–26–17 (13)	Al Bryant	PTS	10	Feb 26, 1928	Laurel Garden, Newark, New Jersey, US	
145	Win	89–26–17 (13)	Hubert Gillis	PTS	6	Feb 25, 1928	Ridgewood Grove, New York City, New York, US	
144	Loss	88–26–17 (13)	Al Gordon	PTS	10	Feb 13, 1928	Arena, Philadelphia, Pennsylvania, US	
143	Loss	88–25–17 (13)	Lope Tenorio	PTS	10	Jan 17, 1928	Public Hall, Cleveland, Ohio, US	
142	Win	88–24–17 (13)	Johnny Farr	PTS	12	Jan 4, 1928	Public Hall, Cleveland, Ohio, US	
141	Loss	87–24–17 (13)	Tod Morgan	DQ	14 (15), 2:09	Dec 16, 1927	Madison Square Garden, New York City, New York, US	For NYSAC, NBA, and The Ring super featherweight titles; Glick was DQ'd for a low blow which knocked Morgan down
140	Win	87–23–17 (13)	Jack Bernstein	PTS	10	Nov 14, 1927	Madison Square Garden, New York City, New York, US	
139	Win	86–23–17 (13)	Johnny Jadick	PTS	10	Oct 26, 1927	108th Field Artillery Armory, Philadelphia, Pennsylvania, US	
138	Win	85–23–17 (13)	Bobby Garcia	PTS	10	Oct 10, 1927	Broadway Arena, New York City, New York, US	
137	Win	84–23–17 (13)	Doc Snell	PTS	10	Sep 15, 1927	Madison Square Garden, New York City, New York, US	
136	Loss	83–23–17 (13)	Mickey Chapin	DQ	4 (8)	Sep 2, 1927	Ocean Park Casino, Long Branch, New Jersey, US	
135	Win	83–22–17 (13)	Bobby Garcia	PTS	10	Aug 22, 1927	Dexter Park Arena, Woodhaven, New York City, New York, US	
134	Win	82–22–17 (13)	André Routis	PTS	10	Aug 17, 1927	Ebbets Field, New York City, New York, US	
133	Win	81–22–17 (13)	Mike Dundee	PTS	10	Jul 25, 1927	Shewbridge Field, Chicago, Illinois, US	
132	Win	80–22–17 (13)	Frankie Fink	PTS	10	Jul 12, 1927	Queensboro Stadium, New York City, New York, US	
131	Loss	79–22–17 (13)	Benny Bass	PTS	10	Jun 27, 1927	Shibe Park, Philadelphia, Pennsylvania, US	
130	Win	79–21–17 (13)	André Routis	PTS	10	Jun 7, 1927	Queensboro Stadium, New York City, New York, US	
129	NC	78–21–17 (13)	'Cowboy' Eddie Anderson	NC	7 (10), 0:38	Apr 25, 1927	Arena, Philadelphia, Philadelphia, US	Bout stopped as both men were "stalling" and pulling their punches
128	Win	78–21–17 (12)	Bobby Jones	KO	1 (10), 0:38	Apr 18, 1927	Laurel Garden, Newark, New Jersey, US	
127	NC	77–21–17 (12)	Benny Bass	NC	3 (10)	Apr 11, 1927	Arena, Philadelphia, Pennsylvania, US	Declared a no-contest by the PSAC since Bass had been struck with a low blow, which felled him for the count
126	Win	77–21–17 (11)	Sollie Castellane	NWS	10	Mar 28, 1927	Laurel Garden, Newark, New Jersey, US	
125	Loss	77–21–17 (10)	Benny Bass	UD	10	Mar 21, 1927	Arena, Philadelphia, Pennsylvania, US	
124	Win	77–20–17 (10)	Freddie Müller	PTS	6	Feb 28, 1927	Broadway Auditorium, Buffalo, New York, US	
123	Loss	76–20–17 (10)	Petey Mack	DQ	5 (6)	Jan 15, 1927	Ridgewood Grove, New York City, New York, US	
122	Draw	76–19–17 (10)	Mike Ballerino	PTS	10	Dec 20, 1926	Broadway Arena, New York City, New York, US	
121	Loss	76–19–16 (10)	Al Delmont	NWS	10	Nov 29, 1926	Newark, New Jersey, US	
120	Draw	76–19–16 (9)	Mike Ballerino	PTS	10	Nov 13, 1926	Ridgewood Grove, New York City, New York, US	
119	Win	76–19–15 (9)	Al Delmont	DQ	2 (10)	Nov 1, 1926	Laurel Garden, Newark, New Jersey, US	
118	Loss	75–19–15 (9)	Tod Morgan	PTS	15	Sep 30, 1926	Madison Square Garden, New York City, New York, US	For NYSAC and The Ring super featherweight titles
117	Loss	75–18–15 (9)	Jimmy McLarnin	PTS	10	Sep 7, 1926	Arena, Vernon, California, US	
116	Loss	75–17–15 (9)	Ray Miller	NWS	10	Aug 26, 1926	Mills Stadium, Chicago, Illinois, US	
115	Draw	75–17–15 (8)	'Cowboy' Eddie Anderson	PTS	10	Aug 5, 1926	Mills Stadium, Chicago, Illinois, US	
114	Win	75–17–14 (8)	Ray Miller	PTS	10	Jul 24, 1926	Coney Island Stadium, New York City, New York, US	
113	Loss	74–17–14 (8)	Dick Finnegan	KO	6 (10), 1:17	Jun 16, 1926	Braves Field, Boston, Massachusetts, US	
112	Win	74–16–14 (8)	'Cowboy' Eddie Anderson	PTS	10	Jun 11, 1926	Coney Island Stadium, New York City, New York, US	
111	Loss	73–16–14 (8)	Carl Duane	DQ	6 (10), 1:22	May 25, 1926	Queensboro Stadium, New York City, New York, US	
110	Win	73–15–14 (8)	Tommy Farley	NWS	10	Apr 23, 1926	Arcola Park Arena, Hackensack, New Jersey, US	
109	Win	73–15–14 (7)	Petey Mack	NWS	10	Apr 14, 1926	4th Regiment Armory, Jersey City, New Jersey, US	
108	Loss	73–15–14 (6)	Frankie LaFay	PTS	10	Mar 19, 1926	Arena, Syracuse, New York, US	
107	Win	73–14–14 (6)	Jackie West	TKO	10 (15)	Feb 22, 1926	Broadway Arena, New York City, New York, US	
106	Win	72–14–14 (6)	Benny Gould	NWS	10	Feb 5, 1926	Convention Hall, Camden, New Jersey, US	
105	Win	72–14–14 (5)	Johnny Dundee	PTS	10	Jan 29, 1926	Madison Square Garden, New York City, New York, US	
104	Win	71–14–14 (5)	Ruby Stein	TKO	7 (10)	Jan 18, 1926	Broadway Arena, New York City, New York, US	
103	Win	70–14–14 (5)	Danny Kramer	PTS	10	Jan 8, 1926	Madison Square Garden, New York City, New York, US	
102	Win	69–14–14 (5)	Billy Kennedy	UD	12	Dec 28, 1925	Broadway Arena, New York City, New York, US	
101	Win	68–14–14 (5)	Jose Lombardo	TKO	6 (10), 1:25	Dec 14, 1925	Broadway Arena, New York City, New York, US	
100	Win	67–14–14 (5)	Eugenio Fernandez	TKO	5 (10)	Dec 5, 1925	Commonwealth Sporting Club, New York City, New York, US	
99	Win	66–14–14 (5)	Dick Finnegan	PTS	10	Nov 23, 1925	Broadway Arena, New York City, New York, US	
98	Draw	65–14–14 (5)	Jackie Brady	PTS	10	Oct 27, 1925	Knickerbocker A.C. Arena, Albany, New York, US	
97	Win	65–14–13 (5)	Johnny Cooney	PTS	12	Oct 20, 1925	27th Division Train Armory, New York City, New York, US	
96	Loss	64–14–13 (5)	Tony Palmer	DQ	7 (10)	Aug 27, 1925	Dexter Park, Woodhaven, New York City, New York, US	
95	Draw	64–13–13 (5)	Johnny O'Connor	PTS	12	Aug 17, 1925	Stadium, Troy, New York, US	
94	NC	64–13–12 (5)	Johnny O'Connor	NC	1 (12)	Aug 10, 1925	Stadium, Troy, New York, US	This bout was stopped due to rain
93	Draw	64–13–12 (4)	Harry Felix	PTS	12	Jul 27, 1925	Queensboro Stadium, New York City, New York, US	
92	Win	64–13–11 (4)	Johnny Kochansky	NWS	10	Jul 10, 1925	Bayonne, Louisiana, US	
91	Win	64–13–11 (3)	Bobby Garcia	DQ	7 (10), 1:05	Jun 4, 1925	Dexter Park, Woodhaven, New York City, New York, US	Garcia was DQ'd for punching low
90	Loss	63–13–11 (3)	Johnny O'Connor	DQ	3 (12)	May 27, 1925	Stadium, Troy, New York, US	Glick was DQ'd for punching low
89	Win	63–12–11 (3)	Frankie LaFay	PTS	12	May 12, 1925	Knickerbocker A.C. Arena, Albany, New York, US	
88	Win	62–12–11 (3)	Gavino Demair	PTS	8	May 5, 1925	27th Division Train Armory, New York City, New York, US	
87	Win	61–12–11 (3)	Johnny Cooney	PTS	12	Apr 30, 1925	102nd Medical Regiment Armory, New York City, New York, US	
86	Draw	60–12–11 (3)	Frankie LaFay	PTS	12	Apr 21, 1925	Knickerbocker A.C. Arena, Albany, New York, US	
85	Win	60–12–10 (3)	Petey Hayes	PTS	12	Apr 7, 1925	27th Division Train Armory, New York City, New York, US	
84	Win	59–12–10 (3)	Tony Palmer	PTS	12	Mar 24, 1925	27th Division Train Armory, New York City, New York, US	
83	Win	58–12–10 (3)	Joey Baker	PTS	10	Mar 12, 1925	Rink S.C., New York City, New York, US	
82	Win	57–12–10 (3)	Tony Palmer	PTS	12	Mar 3, 1925	27th Division Train Armory, New York City, New York, US	
81	Win	56–12–10 (3)	Jack 'Kid' Bates	KO	7 (12)	Feb 17, 1925	27th Division Train Armory, New York City, New York, US	
80	Win	55–12–10 (3)	Tony Palmer	PTS	12	Feb 7, 1925	14th Regiment Armory, New York City, New York, US	
79	Win	54–12–10 (3)	Harry Russell	KO	2 (10)	Jan 27, 1925	27th Division Train Armory, New York City, New York, US	
78	Win	53–12–10 (3)	Harry Sutton	TKO	6 (10)	Jan 13, 1925	27th Division Train Armory, New York City, New York, US	
77	Loss	52–12–10 (3)	Bobby Garcia	KO	5 (10)	Jan 8, 1925	Manhattan Casino, New York City, New York, US	
76	Win	52–11–10 (3)	Jimmy Hutchinson	PTS	6	Dec 6, 1924	Ridgewood Grove, New York City, New York, US	
75	Win	51–11–10 (3)	Frankie Maxwell	PTS	10	Oct 24, 1924	Pioneer Sporting Club, New York City, New York, US	
74	Loss	50–11–10 (3)	Joey Silvers	DQ	7 (12), 1:58	Oct 3, 1924	Madison Square Garden, New York City, New York, US	
73	Draw	50–10–10 (3)	Joey Silvers	PTS	10	Sep 10, 1924	Henderson's Bowl, New York City, New York, US	
72	Loss	50–10–9 (3)	Joey Silvers	PTS	10	Aug 19, 1924	Henderson's Bowl, New York City, New York, US	
71	Win	50–9–9 (3)	Eddie Brady	PTS	12	Jul 23, 1924	Henderson's Bowl, New York City, New York, US	
70	Win	49–9–9 (3)	Frankie Garcia	NWS	6	Jun 27, 1924	Sager's Arena, Aurora, Illinois, US	
69	Win	49–9–9 (2)	Frankie Schaeffer	NWS	10	Jun 13, 1924	Sager's Arena, Aurora, Illinois, US	
68	Win	49–9–9 (1)	Marty Mandeville	PTS	10	May 27, 1924	Knickerbocker A.C. Arena, Albany, New York, US	
67	Win	48–9–9 (1)	Jimmy Hutchinson	PTS	6	May 2, 1924	Madison Square Garden, New York City, New York, US	
66	Loss	47–9–9 (1)	Frankie Edwards	DQ	5 (6)	Apr 5, 1924	Ridgewood Grove SC, New York City, New York, US	
65	Win	47–8–9 (1)	Ruby Stein	PTS	12	Mar 31, 1924	Broadway Arena, New York City, New York, US	
64	Win	46–8–9 (1)	Edwin Riley	PTS	12	Mar 18, 1924	47th Regiment Armory, New York City, New York, US	
63	Win	45–8–9 (1)	Johnny Kochansky	PTS	6	Mar 14, 1924	Madison Square Garden, New York City, New York, US	
62	Win	44–8–9 (1)	Young Diamond	PTS	12	Mar 4, 1924	27th Division Train Armory, New York City, New York, US	
61	Win	43–8–9 (1)	Jimmy Hutchinson	PTS	6	Mar 1, 1924	Ridgewood Grove, New York City, New York, US	
60	Loss	42–8–9 (1)	Johnny Kochansky	PTS	6	Feb 16, 1924	Ridgewood Grove, New York City, New York, US	
59	Win	42–7–9 (1)	Jack McGeehan	PTS	6	Feb 9, 1924	Ridgewood Grove, New York City, New York, US	
58	Draw	41–7–9 (1)	Tony Palmer	PTS	6	Jan 19, 1924	Ridgewood Grove, New York City, New York, US	
57	Win	41–7–8 (1)	Tony Palmer	PTS	6	Jan 5, 1924	Ridgewood Grove, New York City, New York, US	
56	Loss	40–7–8 (1)	Johnny Kochansky	PTS	6	Dec 14, 1923	Madison Square Garden, New York City, New York, US	
55	Win	40–6–8 (1)	Billy Brown	KO	3 (?)	Dec 8, 1923	9th Coast Defense Armory, New York City, New York, US	
54	Win	39–6–8 (1)	Harry Sutton	PTS	10	Nov 27, 1923	27th Division Train Armory, New York City, New York, US	
53	Loss	38–6–8 (1)	Jackie Brady	PTS	6	Nov 12, 1923	Broadway Arena, New York City, New York, US	
52	Draw	38–5–8 (1)	Joey Silvers	PTS	6	Oct 22, 1923	Broadway Arena, New York City, New York, US	
51	Win	38–5–7 (1)	Emil Morrow	PTS	12	Oct 16, 1923	47th Regiment Armory, New York City, New York, US	
50	Draw	37–5–7 (1)	Johnny Kochansky	PTS	6	Oct 11, 1923	Rink S.C., New York City, New York, US	
49	Win	37–5–6 (1)	Harry Simmons	TKO	2 (?)	Oct 6, 1923	Ridgewood Grove, New York City, New York, US	
48	Win	36–5–6 (1)	Emil Morrow	PTS	12	Sep 25, 1923	27th Division Train Armory, New York City, New York, US	
47	Draw	35–5–6 (1)	Tony Palmer	PTS	6	Sep 22, 1923	Ridgewood Grove SC, New York City, New York, US	
46	Win	35–5–5 (1)	Joe 'Kid' Richie	PTS	6	Sep 17, 1923	Broadway Arena, New York City, New York, US	
45	Win	34–5–5 (1)	Billy Brown	PTS	6	Aug 10, 1923	Arena, Rockaway Beach, New York City, New York, US	
44	Draw	33–5–5 (1)	Joey Silvers	PTS	6	Aug 4, 1923	Ridgewood Grove, New York City, New York, US	
43	Loss	33–5–4 (1)	Jimmy Hutchinson	PTS	6	Jun 9, 1923	Ridgewood Grove SC, New York City, New York, US	
42	Win	33–4–4 (1)	Al Ketchell	PTS	6	May 24, 1923	Broadway Arena, New York City, New York, US	
41	Win	32–4–4 (1)	Ruby Stein	PTS	6	May 12, 1923	Ridgewood Grove SC, New York City, New York, US	
40	Win	31–4–4 (1)	Jack Ricca	PTS	6	May 1, 1923	Pioneer Sporting Club, New York City, New York, US	Exact date and location unknown
39	Win	30–4–4 (1)	Lou Guglielmini	PTS	6	Apr 28, 1923	Clermont Avenue Rink, New York City, New York, US	
38	Win	29–4–4 (1)	Billy Brown	PTS	6	Apr 17, 1923	Pioneer Sporting Club, New York City, New York, US	Exact date and location unknown
37	Win	28–4–4 (1)	Roy Taylor	TKO	3 (?)	Apr 3, 1923	47th Regiment Armory, New York City, New York, US	
36	Win	27–4–4 (1)	Ruby Stein	PTS	12	Mar 6, 1923	47th Regiment Armory, New York City, New York, US	
35	Win	26–4–4 (1)	Sammy Melvin	DQ	10 (12)	Feb 13, 1923	47th Regiment Armory, New York City, New York, US	
34	Win	25–4–4 (1)	Al Kale	PTS	12	Feb 2, 1923	2nd Naval Militia Armory, New York City, New York, US	
33	Win	24–4–4 (1)	Ruby Stein	PTS	12	Jan 16, 1923	47th Regiment Armory, New York City, New York, US	
32	Loss	23–4–4 (1)	Petey Hayes	KO	6 (?)	Jan 6, 1923	9th Coast Defense Armory, New York City, New York, US	
31	Loss	23–3–4 (1)	Young Diamond	PTS	8	Dec 21, 1922	102nd Medical Regiment Armory, New York City, New York, US	
30	Win	23–2–4 (1)	Al Kale	PTS	12	Nov 21, 1922	47th Regiment Armory, New York City, New York, US	Won vacant National Guard featherweight title
29	Win	22–2–4 (1)	Young Diamond	PTS	12	Nov 16, 1922	102nd Medical Regiment Armory, New York City, New York, US	
28	Draw	21–2–4 (1)	Kid Butler	PTS	12	Nov 4, 1922	2nd Field Artillery Reg. Armory, New York City, New York, US	
27	Win	21–2–3 (1)	Thaddeus 'Kid' Bacon	KO	4 (?)	Nov 1, 1922	47th Regiment Armory, New York City, New York, US	
26	Win	20–2–3 (1)	Young Diamond	PTS	12	Oct 21, 1922	9th Coast Defense Armory, New York City, New York, US	
25	Win	19–2–3 (1)	Red K.O. O'Neil	KO	7 (?)	Oct 12, 1922	102nd Medical Regiment Armory, New York City, New York, US	
24	Win	18–2–3 (1)	Jack McCoy	TKO	4 (?)	Sep 29, 1922	New York City, New York, US	
23	Loss	17–2–3 (1)	Jimmy Hutchinson	TD	6 (6)	Aug 19, 1922	Ridgewood Grove, New York City, New York, US	
22	Win	17–1–3 (1)	Joe Stanley	PTS	6	Jul 29, 1922	Ridgewood Grove SC, New York City, New York, US	
21	Win	16–1–3 (1)	Battling Burke	KO	2 (10)	Jul 13, 1922	47th Regiment Armory, New York City, New York, US	
20	Win	15–1–3 (1)	Joe Eppy	PTS	12	Jun 15, 1922	47th Regiment Armory, New York City, New York, US	
19	Draw	14–1–3 (1)	Sammy Kirsch	PTS	12	Apr 22, 1922	47th Regiment Armory, New York City, New York, US	
18	Draw	14–1–2 (1)	Sammy Marco	PTS	12	Apr 15, 1922	47th Regiment Armory, New York City, New York, US	
17	Loss	14–1–1 (1)	Willie Allen	PTS	12	Mar 25, 1922	Ridgewood Grove SC, New York City, New York, US	
16	Win	14–0–1 (1)	Joe Mickel	PTS	10	Feb 11, 1922	47th Regiment Armory, New York City, New York, US	
15	Win	13–0–1 (1)	Joe Eppy	PTS	12	Feb 4, 1922	47th Regiment Armory, New York City, New York, US	
14	Win	12–0–1 (1)	Joe Eppy	PTS	10	Jan 21, 1922	69th Regiment Armory, New York City, New York, US	
13	Win	11–0–1 (1)	Mike Dundee	KO	2 (?)	Dec 31, 1921	47th Battalion Corps of Engineer, New York City, New York, US	
12	Draw	10–0–1 (1)	Frankie O'Neill	PTS	4	Dec 15, 1921	New York City, New York, US	Exact date and location not known at this time
11	ND	10–0 (1)	Joe Eppy	ND	12	Dec 3, 1921	47th Battalion Corps of Engineer, New York City, New York, US	No result to date
10	Win	10–0	Sergeant Marshall	TKO	4 (10)	Nov 25, 1921	15th Regiment Armory, New York City, New York, US	
9	Win	9–0	Harry Lamar	PTS	10	Nov 19, 1921	47th Regiment Armory, New York City, New York, US	
8	Win	8–0	Ed Monroe	KO	3 (?)	Nov 5, 1921	47th Regiment Armory, New York City, New York, US	
7	Win	7–0	Harry Gardner	DQ	2 (4)	Oct 8, 1921	47th Regiment Armory, New York City, New York, US	
6	Win	6–0	Willie Conway	PTS	10	Oct 1, 1921	47th Regiment Armory, New York City, New York, US	
5	Win	5–0	Jesse Kaufman	KO	2 (?)	Sep 17, 1921	47th Regiment Armory, New York City, New York, US	
4	Win	4–0	Kid Specks	KO	3 (4)	Sep 9, 1921	15th Regiment Armory, New York City, New York, US	
3	Win	3–0	Kid Cunningham	PTS	4	Sep 2, 1921	15th Regiment Armory, New York City, New York, US	
2	Win	2–0	Joe Mastara	PTS	10	Aug 1, 1921	New York City, New York, US	Exact date and location unknown
1	Win	1–0	Nate Ripon	KO	5 (?)	Feb 14, 1921	New York City, New York, US	Exact date and location unknown; Professional debut

=== Unofficial record ===
245 fights	136 wins	72 losses
By knockout	25	10
By decision	107	57
By disqualification	4	5
Draws	32	
No contests	5	

Record with the inclusion of newspaper decisions in the win/loss/draw column.

No.	Result	Record	Opponent	Type	Round, time	Date	Location	Notes
245	Loss	136–72–32 (5)	Freddie Steele	KO	1 (10)	Oct 26, 1934	Armory, Yakima, Washington, US	
244	Loss	136–71–32 (5)	Ceferino Garcia	KO	2 (10)	Sep 1, 1934	Pismo Beach Arena, Pismo Beach, California, US	
243	Loss	136–70–32 (5)	Baby Joe Gans	PTS	10	Jul 3, 1934	Colorado Springs, Colorado, US	
242	Loss	136–69–32 (5)	Willard Brown	TKO	7 (10)	Jun 4, 1934	Coliseum Arena, New Orleans, Louisiana, US	
241	Loss	136–68–32 (5)	Johnny Hanlon	PTS	10	Apr 30, 1934	North Street Rink, Salem, Massachusetts, US	
240	Loss	136–67–32 (5)	Pat Igo	PTS	8	Apr 24, 1934	Charlton's Hall, Pottsville, Pennsylvania, US	
239	Loss	136–66–32 (5)	Elmer Bezenah	NWS	12	Apr 20, 1934	Exposition Building, Portland, Maine, US	
238	Loss	136–65–32 (5)	Harry Serody	TKO	9 (10)	Apr 9, 1934	Arena, Philadelphia, Pennsylvania, US	
237	Loss	136–64–32 (5)	George Gibbs	PTS	8	Apr 6, 1934	Waltz Dream Arena, Atlantic City, New Jersey, US	
236	Win	136–63–32 (5)	'Young' Patsy Wallace	PTS	8	Mar 23, 1934	Waltz Dream Arena, Atlantic City, New Jersey, US	
235	Loss	135–63–32 (5)	Joe Rossi	PTS	10	Mar 21, 1934	Broadway Arena, New York City, New York, US	
234	Loss	135–62–32 (5)	Joey Speigal	PTS	6	Mar 12, 1934	Public Hall, Cleveland, Ohio, US	
233	Loss	135–61–32 (5)	Johnny Jadick	PTS	10	Jan 12, 1934	Cambria A.C., Philadelphia, Pennsylvania, US	
232	Draw	135–60–32 (5)	Eddie Dempsey	PTS	6	Jan 2, 1934	Arena, Syracuse, New York, US	
231	Draw	135–60–31 (5)	Gus Campbell	PTS	10	Nov 20, 1933	Newark, New Jersey, US	
230	Loss	135–60–30 (5)	Tony Falco	PTS	10	Nov 2, 1933	Broadway Arena, New York City, New York, US	
229	Loss	135–59–30 (5)	Tommy Corbett	PTS	10	Oct 13, 1933	International Arena, Kansas City, Missouri, US	
228	Loss	135–58–30 (5)	Tracy Cox	KO	6 (10)	Sep 28, 1933	Fox and Fox Arena, Fort Worth, Texas, US	
227	Loss	135–57–30 (5)	Freddie Steele	PTS	8	Jun 22, 1933	Natatorium Park, Spokane, Washington, US	
226	Loss	135–56–30 (5)	Swede Berglund	PTS	10	Jun 9, 1933	Coliseum, San Diego, California, US	
225	Draw	135–55–30 (5)	Alfredo Gaona	PTS	10	Apr 2, 1933	El Toreo de Cuatro Caminos, Mexico City, Mexico	
224	Win	135–55–29 (5)	Carlos Ramos	PTS	10	Mar 18, 1933	El Toreo de Cuatro Caminos, Mexico City, Mexico	
223	Win	134–55–29 (5)	Manuel Luna	KO	6 (10)	Mar 9, 1933	Mexico City, Mexico	
222	Loss	133–55–29 (5)	Kid Azteca	PTS	10	Feb 18, 1933	Arena Nacional, Mexico City, Mexico	
221	Draw	133–54–29 (5)	Sammy Santos	PTS	6	Jan 24, 1933	Crystal Pool, Seattle, Washington, US	
220	Loss	133–54–28 (5)	Young Corbett III	PTS	10	Dec 19, 1932	Exposition Auditorium, San Francisco, California, US	
219	Draw	133–53–28 (5)	Alfredo Gaona	PTS	10	Dec 12, 1932	Arena Nacional, Mexico City, Mexico	
218	Draw	133–53–27 (5)	Tommy King	PTS	10	Oct 14, 1932	Legion Stadium, Hollywood, California, US	
217	NC	133–53–26 (5)	Andy DiVodi	NC	7 (10)	Aug 5, 1932	Dreamland Auditorium, San Francisco, California, US	
216	Win	133–53–26 (4)	David Velasco	PTS	10	Jul 25, 1932	Wrigley Field, Los Angeles, California, US	
215	Win	132–53–26 (4)	Gaston LeCadre	PTS	10	Jun 13, 1932	Civic Auditorium, San Francisco, California, US	
214	Win	131–53–26 (4)	Jackie Purvis	PTS	10	Jun 3, 1932	Dreamland Auditorium, San Francisco, California, US	
213	Win	130–53–26 (4)	Paolo Villa	PTS	6	Feb 16, 1932	Elks Lodge 22, New York City, New York, US	
212	Draw	129–53–26 (4)	Vincent Hambright	PTS	8	Feb 1, 1932	Jamaica Arena, New York City, New York, US	
211	Draw	129–53–25 (4)	Eduardo Duarry	PTS	6	Jan 18, 1932	Jamaica Arena, New York City, New York, US	
210	Win	129–53–24 (4)	Willie Smith	PTS	10	Dec 7, 1931	Arena, Trenton, New Jersey, US	
209	Loss	128–53–24 (4)	Jimmy McNamara	PTS	8	Nov 10, 1931	Elks Lodge 22, New York City, New York, US	
208	Win	128–52–24 (4)	Jimmy Phillips	PTS	10	Oct 26, 1931	Laurel Garden, Newark, New Jersey, US	
207	Loss	127–52–24 (4)	Mike Payan	PTS	6	Oct 10, 1931	Ridgewood Grove, New York City, New York, US	
206	Loss	127–51–24 (4)	Andy Saviola	PTS	6	Sep 26, 1931	Ridgewood Grove, New York City, New York, US	
205	Win	127–50–24 (4)	Emil Rossi	PTS	8	Sep 8, 1931	Queensboro Stadium, New York City, New York, US	
204	Win	126–50–24 (4)	Meliton Aragon	PTS	6	Aug 28, 1931	Long Beach Stadium, Long Beach, New Jersey, US	
203	Win	125–50–24 (4)	Henry Perlick	PTS	8	Aug 14, 1931	Long Beach Stadium, Long Beach, New Jersey, US	
202	Win	124–50–24 (4)	Mike Sarko	PTS	8	Jul 22, 1931	Bronx Parkway Arena, White Plains, New York, US	
201	Win	123–50–24 (4)	Eddie Guida	PTS	6	Jun 26, 1931	Long Beach Stadium, Long Beach, New Jersey, US	
200	Draw	122–50–24 (4)	Johnny Hayes	PTS	10	Jun 3, 1931	Convention Hall, Atlantic City, New Jersey, US	
199	Win	122–50–23 (4)	Joe Americo	KO	2 (8), 1:35	May 22, 1931	Stauch's Arena, New York City, New York, US	
198	Loss	121–50–23 (4)	Billy Wallace	PTS	8	May 8, 1931	Equestrium, Cleveland, Ohio, US	
197	Draw	121–49–23 (4)	Phil Rafferty	PTS	10	May 4, 1931	St. Nicholas Arena, New York City, New York, US	
196	Win	121–49–22 (4)	Joe Lucero	PTS	10	Apr 10, 1931	Madison Square Garden, Phoenix, Arizona, US	
195	Loss	120–49–22 (4)	Billy Townsend	PTS	10	Mar 31, 1931	Olympic Auditorium, Los Angeles, California, US	
194	Win	120–48–22 (4)	Teddy Palacios	KO	4 (6)	Mar 6, 1931	Dreamland Auditorium, San Francisco, California, US	
193	Draw	119–48–22 (4)	Johnny Lamar	PTS	10	Feb 12, 1931	Memorial Auditorium, Sacramento, California, US	
192	Loss	119–48–21 (4)	Eddie Wolfe	PTS	8	Jan 22, 1931	Auditorium, Memphis, Tennessee, US	
191	Draw	119–47–21 (4)	Jackie Shupack	PTS	8	Dec 11, 1930	Armory, Paterson, New Jersey, US	
190	Loss	119–47–20 (4)	Tony Herrera	KO	7 (10)	Nov 17, 1930	Motor Square Garden, Pittsburgh, Pennsylvania, US	
189	Win	119–46–20 (4)	Henry Perlick	SD	10	Nov 3, 1930	Massey Hall, Toronto, Ontario, Canada	
188	Draw	118–46–20 (4)	Tony Herrera	PTS	10	Oct 6, 1930	Motor Square Garden, Pittsburgh, Pennsylvania, US	
187	Loss	118–46–19 (4)	Jack 'Kid' Berg	UD	10	Sep 18, 1930	Queensboro Stadium, New York City, New York, US	
186	Loss	118–45–19 (4)	Mickey Cohen	NWS	10	Sep 1, 1930	Kansas City, Missouri, US	Not to be confused with Mickey Cohen
185	Loss	118–44–19 (4)	Billy Townsend	UD	10	Aug 18, 1930	Arena Gardens, Toronto, Ontario, Canada	
184	Loss	118–43–19 (4)	Justo Suárez	PTS	10	Jul 17, 1930	Yankee Stadium, New York City, New City, US	
183	Loss	118–42–19 (4)	Johnny O'Keefe	PTS	10	Jun 26, 1930	Garfield, New Jersey, US	
182	Loss	118–41–19 (4)	Tony Canzoneri	PTS	10	Jun 4, 1930	Ebbets Field, New York City, New York, US	
181	Draw	118–40–19 (4)	Lud Abella	PTS	10	May 12, 1930	Laurel Garden, Newark, New Jersey, US	
180	Loss	118–40–18 (4)	Jack 'Kid' Berg	UD	10	Apr 4, 1930	Madison Square Garden, New York City, New York, US	For NBA and The Ring light welterweight titles
179	Win	118–39–18 (4)	Georgie Balduc	PTS	10	Mar 25, 1930	Broadway Arena, New York City, New York, US	
178	Win	117–39–18 (4)	Buster Brown	PTS	10	Mar 17, 1930	10th Regiment Armory, Baltimore, Maryland, US	
177	Win	116–39–18 (4)	Tony Lambert	PTS	10	Mar 10, 1930	Laurel Garden, Newark, New Jersey, US	
176	Win	115–39–18 (4)	Billy McMahon	PTS	10	Mar 3, 1930	St. Nicholas Arena, New York City, New York, US	
175	Win	114–39–18 (4)	Petey Mack	PTS	10	Feb 11, 1930	Broadway Arena, New York City, New York, US	
174	Win	113–39–18 (4)	Doc Snell	PTS	6	Jan 1, 1930	Greenwich Coliseum, Tacoma, Washington, US	
173	Loss	112–39–18 (4)	Tommy Grogan	PTS	10	Dec 6, 1929	Dreamland Auditorium, San Francisco, California, US	
172	Loss	112–38–18 (4)	Eddie Murdock	PTS	10	Nov 15, 1929	Legion Stadium, Hollywood, California, US	
171	Win	112–37–18 (4)	Frankie Stetson	PTS	10	Nov 4, 1929	State Armory, San Francisco, California, US	
170	Win	111–37–18 (4)	Frankie Stetson	PTS	10	Sep 30, 1929	State Armory, San Francisco, California, US	
169	Loss	110–37–18 (4)	Manuel Quintero	PTS	10	Jul 31, 1929	Ebbets Field, New York City, New York, US	
168	Win	110–36–18 (4)	Lope Tenorio	PTS	10	Jul 23, 1929	Queensboro Stadium, New York City, New York, US	
167	Loss	109–36–18 (4)	Billy Wallace	PTS	12	May 21, 1929	Public Hall, Cleveland, Ohio, US	
166	Win	109–35–18 (4)	Luis Vicentini	PTS	10	May 10, 1929	Madison Square Garden, New York City, New York, US	
165	Loss	108–35–18 (4)	Georgie Day	PTS	10	May 6, 1929	Arena, New Haven, Connecticut, US	
164	Loss	108–34–18 (4)	Louis 'Kid' Kaplan	PTS	10	Apr 2, 1929	Arena, New Haven, Connecticut, US	
163	Loss	108–33–18 (4)	Jimmy McLarnin	KO	2 (10), 1:37	Mar 1, 1929	Madison Square Garden, New York City, New York, US	
162	Loss	108–32–18 (4)	Jimmy McLarnin	UD	10	Jan 11, 1929	Madison Square Garden, New York City, New York, US	
161	Win	108–31–18 (4)	Petey Mack	PTS	10	Dec 17, 1928	Broadway Arena, New York City, New York, US	
160	Win	107–31–18 (4)	Baby Joe Gans	PTS	10	Nov 16, 1928	Madison Square Garden, New York City, New York, US	
159	Loss	106–31–18 (4)	'Cowboy' Eddie Anderson	PTS	10	Oct 26, 1928	City Auditorium, Omaha, Nebraska, US	
158	Win	106–30–18 (4)	Hubert Gillis	PTS	10	Oct 19, 1928	Olympia Stadium, Detroit, Michigan, US	
157	Win	105–30–18 (4)	Tommy Grogan	PTS	10	Oct 5, 1928	Madison Square Garden, New York City, New York, US	
156	Win	104–30–18 (4)	Jackie Shupack	PTS	8	Sep 11, 1928	Arena, Garfield, New Jersey, US	
155	Win	103–30–18 (4)	Frankie Fink	PTS	10	Sep 4, 1928	Dexter Park Arena, Woodhaven, New York City, New York, US	
154	Win	102–30–18 (4)	Lope Tenorio	PTS	10	Aug 21, 1928	Dexter Park Arena, Woodhaven, New York City, New York, US	
153	Win	101–30–18 (4)	Jose Garcia	KO	1 (10)	Aug 6, 1928	Dexter Park Arena, Woodhaven, New York City, New York, US	
152	Loss	100–30–18 (4)	Mike Dundee	PTS	10	Jun 20, 1928	Taylor Bowl, Newburgh Heights, Ohio, US	
151	Loss	100–29–18 (4)	Stanislaus Loayza	PTS	10	Jun 12, 1928	Queensboro Stadium, New York City, New York, US	
150	Draw	100–28–18 (4)	Carl Duane	PTS	10	May 29, 1928	Queensboro Stadium, New York City, New York, US	
149	Win	100–28–17 (4)	Lope Tenorio	PTS	10	May 4, 1928	Madison Square Garden, New York City, New York, US	
148	Win	99–28–17 (4)	Mike Dundee	PTS	12	Apr 9, 1928	Memorial Hall, Dayton, Ohio, US	
147	Win	98–28–17 (4)	Hubert Gillis	PTS	6	Mar 31, 1928	Ridgewood Grove, New York City, New York, US	
146	Win	97–28–17 (4)	Al Bryant	PTS	10	Feb 26, 1928	Laurel Garden, Newark, New Jersey, US	
145	Win	96–28–17 (4)	Hubert Gillis	PTS	6	Feb 25, 1928	Ridgewood Grove, New York City, New York, US	
144	Loss	95–28–17 (4)	Al Gordon	PTS	10	Feb 13, 1928	Arena, Philadelphia, Pennsylvania, US	
143	Loss	95–27–17 (4)	Lope Tenorio	PTS	10	Jan 17, 1928	Public Hall, Cleveland, Ohio, US	
142	Win	95–26–17 (4)	Johnny Farr	PTS	12	Jan 4, 1928	Public Hall, Cleveland, Ohio, US	
141	Loss	94–26–17 (4)	Tod Morgan	DQ	14 (15), 2:09	Dec 16, 1927	Madison Square Garden, New York City, New York, US	For NYSAC, NBA, and The Ring super featherweight titles; Glick was DQ'd for a low blow which knocked Morgan down
140	Win	94–25–17 (4)	Jack Bernstein	PTS	10	Nov 14, 1927	Madison Square Garden, New York City, New York, US	
139	Win	93–25–17 (4)	Johnny Jadick	PTS	10	Oct 26, 1927	108th Field Artillery Armory, Philadelphia, Pennsylvania, US	
138	Win	92–25–17 (4)	Bobby Garcia	PTS	10	Oct 10, 1927	Broadway Arena, New York City, New York, US	
137	Win	91–25–17 (4)	Doc Snell	PTS	10	Sep 15, 1927	Madison Square Garden, New York City, New York, US	
136	Loss	90–25–17 (4)	Mickey Chapin	DQ	4 (8)	Sep 2, 1927	Ocean Park Casino, Long Branch, New Jersey, US	
135	Win	90–24–17 (4)	Bobby Garcia	PTS	10	Aug 22, 1927	Dexter Park Arena, Woodhaven, New York City, New York, US	
134	Win	89–24–17 (4)	André Routis	PTS	10	Aug 17, 1927	Ebbets Field, New York City, New York, US	
133	Win	88–24–17 (4)	Mike Dundee	PTS	10	Jul 25, 1927	Shewbridge Field, Chicago, Illinois, US	
132	Win	87–24–17 (4)	Frankie Fink	PTS	10	Jul 12, 1927	Queensboro Stadium, New York City, New York, US	
131	Loss	86–24–17 (4)	Benny Bass	PTS	10	Jun 27, 1927	Shibe Park, Philadelphia, Pennsylvania, US	
130	Win	86–23–17 (4)	André Routis	PTS	10	Jun 7, 1927	Queensboro Stadium, New York City, New York, US	
129	NC	85–23–17 (4)	'Cowboy' Eddie Anderson	NC	7 (10), 0:38	Apr 25, 1927	Arena, Philadelphia, Philadelphia, US	Bout stopped as both men were "stalling" and pulling their punches
128	Win	85–23–17 (3)	Bobby Jones	KO	1 (10), 0:38	Apr 18, 1927	Laurel Garden, Newark, New Jersey, US	
127	NC	84–23–17 (3)	Benny Bass	NC	3 (10)	Apr 11, 1927	Arena, Philadelphia, Pennsylvania, US	Declared a no-contest by the PSAC since Bass had been struck with a low blow, which felled him for the count
126	Win	84–23–17 (2)	Sollie Castellane	NWS	10	Mar 28, 1927	Laurel Garden, Newark, New Jersey, US	
125	Loss	83–23–17 (2)	Benny Bass	UD	10	Mar 21, 1927	Arena, Philadelphia, Pennsylvania, US	
124	Win	83–22–17 (2)	Freddie Müller	PTS	6	Feb 28, 1927	Broadway Auditorium, Buffalo, New York, US	
123	Loss	82–22–17 (2)	Petey Mack	DQ	5 (6)	Jan 15, 1927	Ridgewood Grove, New York City, New York, US	
122	Draw	82–21–17 (2)	Mike Ballerino	PTS	10	Dec 20, 1926	Broadway Arena, New York City, New York, US	
121	Loss	82–21–16 (2)	Al Delmont	NWS	10	Nov 29, 1926	Newark, New Jersey, US	
120	Draw	82–20–16 (2)	Mike Ballerino	PTS	10	Nov 13, 1926	Ridgewood Grove, New York City, New York, US	
119	Win	82–20–15 (2)	Al Delmont	DQ	2 (10)	Nov 1, 1926	Laurel Garden, Newark, New Jersey, US	
118	Loss	81–20–15 (2)	Tod Morgan	PTS	15	Sep 30, 1926	Madison Square Garden, New York City, New York, US	For NYSAC and The Ring super featherweight titles
117	Loss	81–19–15 (2)	Jimmy McLarnin	PTS	10	Sep 7, 1926	Arena, Vernon, California, US	
116	Loss	81–18–15 (2)	Ray Miller	NWS	10	Aug 26, 1926	Mills Stadium, Chicago, Illinois, US	
115	Draw	81–17–15 (2)	'Cowboy' Eddie Anderson	PTS	10	Aug 5, 1926	Mills Stadium, Chicago, Illinois, US	
114	Win	81–17–14 (2)	Ray Miller	PTS	10	Jul 24, 1926	Coney Island Stadium, New York City, New York, US	
113	Loss	80–17–14 (2)	Dick Finnegan	KO	6 (10), 1:17	Jun 16, 1926	Braves Field, Boston, Massachusetts, US	
112	Win	80–16–14 (2)	'Cowboy' Eddie Anderson	PTS	10	Jun 11, 1926	Coney Island Stadium, New York City, New York, US	
111	Loss	79–16–14 (2)	Carl Duane	DQ	6 (10), 1:22	May 25, 1926	Queensboro Stadium, New York City, New York, US	
110	Win	79–15–14 (2)	Tommy Farley	NWS	10	Apr 23, 1926	Arcola Park Arena, Hackensack, New Jersey, US	
109	Win	78–15–14 (2)	Petey Mack	NWS	10	Apr 14, 1926	4th Regiment Armory, Jersey City, New Jersey, US	
108	Loss	77–15–14 (2)	Frankie LaFay	PTS	10	Mar 19, 1926	Arena, Syracuse, New York, US	
107	Win	77–14–14 (2)	Jackie West	TKO	10 (15)	Feb 22, 1926	Broadway Arena, New York City, New York, US	
106	Win	76–14–14 (2)	Benny Gould	NWS	10	Feb 5, 1926	Convention Hall, Camden, New Jersey, US	
105	Win	75–14–14 (2)	Johnny Dundee	PTS	10	Jan 29, 1926	Madison Square Garden, New York City, New York, US	
104	Win	74–14–14 (2)	Ruby Stein	TKO	7 (10)	Jan 18, 1926	Broadway Arena, New York City, New York, US	
103	Win	73–14–14 (2)	Danny Kramer	PTS	10	Jan 8, 1926	Madison Square Garden, New York City, New York, US	
102	Win	72–14–14 (2)	Billy Kennedy	UD	12	Dec 28, 1925	Broadway Arena, New York City, New York, US	
101	Win	71–14–14 (2)	Jose Lombardo	TKO	6 (10), 1:25	Dec 14, 1925	Broadway Arena, New York City, New York, US	
100	Win	70–14–14 (2)	Eugenio Fernandez	TKO	5 (10)	Dec 5, 1925	Commonwealth Sporting Club, New York City, New York, US	
99	Win	69–14–14 (2)	Dick Finnegan	PTS	10	Nov 23, 1925	Broadway Arena, New York City, New York, US	
98	Draw	68–14–14 (2)	Jackie Brady	PTS	10	Oct 27, 1925	Knickerbocker A.C. Arena, Albany, New York, US	
97	Win	68–14–13 (2)	Johnny Cooney	PTS	12	Oct 20, 1925	27th Division Train Armory, New York City, New York, US	
96	Loss	67–14–13 (2)	Tony Palmer	DQ	7 (10)	Aug 27, 1925	Dexter Park, Woodhaven, New York City, New York, US	
95	Draw	67–13–13 (2)	Johnny O'Connor	PTS	12	Aug 17, 1925	Stadium, Troy, New York, US	
94	NC	67–13–12 (2)	Johnny O'Connor	NC	1 (12)	Aug 10, 1925	Stadium, Troy, New York, US	This bout was stopped due to rain
93	Draw	67–13–12 (1)	Harry Felix	PTS	12	Jul 27, 1925	Queensboro Stadium, New York City, New York, US	
92	Win	67–13–11 (1)	Johnny Kochansky	NWS	10	Jul 10, 1925	Bayonne, Louisiana, US	
91	Win	66–13–11 (1)	Bobby Garcia	DQ	7 (10), 1:05	Jun 4, 1925	Dexter Park, Woodhaven, New York City, New York, US	Garcia was DQ'd for punching low
90	Loss	65–13–11 (1)	Johnny O'Connor	DQ	3 (12)	May 27, 1925	Stadium, Troy, New York, US	Glick was DQ'd for punching low
89	Win	65–12–11 (1)	Frankie LaFay	PTS	12	May 12, 1925	Knickerbocker A.C. Arena, Albany, New York, US	
88	Win	64–12–11 (1)	Gavino Demair	PTS	8	May 5, 1925	27th Division Train Armory, New York City, New York, US	
87	Win	63–12–11 (1)	Johnny Cooney	PTS	12	Apr 30, 1925	102nd Medical Regiment Armory, New York City, New York, US	
86	Draw	62–12–11 (1)	Frankie LaFay	PTS	12	Apr 21, 1925	Knickerbocker A.C. Arena, Albany, New York, US	
85	Win	62–12–10 (1)	Petey Hayes	PTS	12	Apr 7, 1925	27th Division Train Armory, New York City, New York, US	
84	Win	61–12–10 (1)	Tony Palmer	PTS	12	Mar 24, 1925	27th Division Train Armory, New York City, New York, US	
83	Win	60–12–10 (1)	Joey Baker	PTS	10	Mar 12, 1925	Rink S.C., New York City, New York, US	
82	Win	59–12–10 (1)	Tony Palmer	PTS	12	Mar 3, 1925	27th Division Train Armory, New York City, New York, US	
81	Win	58–12–10 (1)	Jack 'Kid' Bates	KO	7 (12)	Feb 17, 1925	27th Division Train Armory, New York City, New York, US	
80	Win	57–12–10 (1)	Tony Palmer	PTS	12	Feb 7, 1925	14th Regiment Armory, New York City, New York, US	
79	Win	56–12–10 (1)	Harry Russell	KO	2 (10)	Jan 27, 1925	27th Division Train Armory, New York City, New York, US	
78	Win	55–12–10 (1)	Harry Sutton	TKO	6 (10)	Jan 13, 1925	27th Division Train Armory, New York City, New York, US	
77	Loss	54–12–10 (1)	Bobby Garcia	KO	5 (10)	Jan 8, 1925	Manhattan Casino, New York City, New York, US	
76	Win	54–11–10 (1)	Jimmy Hutchinson	PTS	6	Dec 6, 1924	Ridgewood Grove, New York City, New York, US	
75	Win	53–11–10 (1)	Frankie Maxwell	PTS	10	Oct 24, 1924	Pioneer Sporting Club, New York City, New York, US	
74	Loss	52–11–10 (1)	Joey Silvers	DQ	7 (12), 1:58	Oct 3, 1924	Madison Square Garden, New York City, New York, US	
73	Draw	52–10–10 (1)	Joey Silvers	PTS	10	Sep 10, 1924	Henderson's Bowl, New York City, New York, US	
72	Loss	52–10–9 (1)	Joey Silvers	PTS	10	Aug 19, 1924	Henderson's Bowl, New York City, New York, US	
71	Win	52–9–9 (1)	Eddie Brady	PTS	12	Jul 23, 1924	Henderson's Bowl, New York City, New York, US	
70	Win	51–9–9 (1)	Frankie Garcia	NWS	6	Jun 27, 1924	Sager's Arena, Aurora, Illinois, US	
69	Win	50–9–9 (1)	Frankie Schaeffer	NWS	10	Jun 13, 1924	Sager's Arena, Aurora, Illinois, US	
68	Win	49–9–9 (1)	Marty Mandeville	PTS	10	May 27, 1924	Knickerbocker A.C. Arena, Albany, New York, US	
67	Win	48–9–9 (1)	Jimmy Hutchinson	PTS	6	May 2, 1924	Madison Square Garden, New York City, New York, US	
66	Loss	47–9–9 (1)	Frankie Edwards	DQ	5 (6)	Apr 5, 1924	Ridgewood Grove SC, New York City, New York, US	
65	Win	47–8–9 (1)	Ruby Stein	PTS	12	Mar 31, 1924	Broadway Arena, New York City, New York, US	
64	Win	46–8–9 (1)	Edwin Riley	PTS	12	Mar 18, 1924	47th Regiment Armory, New York City, New York, US	
63	Win	45–8–9 (1)	Johnny Kochansky	PTS	6	Mar 14, 1924	Madison Square Garden, New York City, New York, US	
62	Win	44–8–9 (1)	Young Diamond	PTS	12	Mar 4, 1924	27th Division Train Armory, New York City, New York, US	
61	Win	43–8–9 (1)	Jimmy Hutchinson	PTS	6	Mar 1, 1924	Ridgewood Grove, New York City, New York, US	
60	Loss	42–8–9 (1)	Johnny Kochansky	PTS	6	Feb 16, 1924	Ridgewood Grove, New York City, New York, US	
59	Win	42–7–9 (1)	Jack McGeehan	PTS	6	Feb 9, 1924	Ridgewood Grove, New York City, New York, US	
58	Draw	41–7–9 (1)	Tony Palmer	PTS	6	Jan 19, 1924	Ridgewood Grove, New York City, New York, US	
57	Win	41–7–8 (1)	Tony Palmer	PTS	6	Jan 5, 1924	Ridgewood Grove, New York City, New York, US	
56	Loss	40–7–8 (1)	Johnny Kochansky	PTS	6	Dec 14, 1923	Madison Square Garden, New York City, New York, US	
55	Win	40–6–8 (1)	Billy Brown	KO	3 (?)	Dec 8, 1923	9th Coast Defense Armory, New York City, New York, US	
54	Win	39–6–8 (1)	Harry Sutton	PTS	10	Nov 27, 1923	27th Division Train Armory, New York City, New York, US	
53	Loss	38–6–8 (1)	Jackie Brady	PTS	6	Nov 12, 1923	Broadway Arena, New York City, New York, US	
52	Draw	38–5–8 (1)	Joey Silvers	PTS	6	Oct 22, 1923	Broadway Arena, New York City, New York, US	
51	Win	38–5–7 (1)	Emil Morrow	PTS	12	Oct 16, 1923	47th Regiment Armory, New York City, New York, US	
50	Draw	37–5–7 (1)	Johnny Kochansky	PTS	6	Oct 11, 1923	Rink S.C., New York City, New York, US	
49	Win	37–5–6 (1)	Harry Simmons	TKO	2 (?)	Oct 6, 1923	Ridgewood Grove, New York City, New York, US	
48	Win	36–5–6 (1)	Emil Morrow	PTS	12	Sep 25, 1923	27th Division Train Armory, New York City, New York, US	
47	Draw	35–5–6 (1)	Tony Palmer	PTS	6	Sep 22, 1923	Ridgewood Grove SC, New York City, New York, US	
46	Win	35–5–5 (1)	Joe 'Kid' Richie	PTS	6	Sep 17, 1923	Broadway Arena, New York City, New York, US	
45	Win	34–5–5 (1)	Billy Brown	PTS	6	Aug 10, 1923	Arena, Rockaway Beach, New York City, New York, US	
44	Draw	33–5–5 (1)	Joey Silvers	PTS	6	Aug 4, 1923	Ridgewood Grove, New York City, New York, US	
43	Loss	33–5–4 (1)	Jimmy Hutchinson	PTS	6	Jun 9, 1923	Ridgewood Grove SC, New York City, New York, US	
42	Win	33–4–4 (1)	Al Ketchell	PTS	6	May 24, 1923	Broadway Arena, New York City, New York, US	
41	Win	32–4–4 (1)	Ruby Stein	PTS	6	May 12, 1923	Ridgewood Grove SC, New York City, New York, US	
40	Win	31–4–4 (1)	Jack Ricca	PTS	6	May 1, 1923	Pioneer Sporting Club, New York City, New York, US	Exact date and location unknown
39	Win	30–4–4 (1)	Lou Guglielmini	PTS	6	Apr 28, 1923	Clermont Avenue Rink, New York City, New York, US	
38	Win	29–4–4 (1)	Billy Brown	PTS	6	Apr 17, 1923	Pioneer Sporting Club, New York City, New York, US	Exact date and location unknown
37	Win	28–4–4 (1)	Roy Taylor	TKO	3 (?)	Apr 3, 1923	47th Regiment Armory, New York City, New York, US	
36	Win	27–4–4 (1)	Ruby Stein	PTS	12	Mar 6, 1923	47th Regiment Armory, New York City, New York, US	
35	Win	26–4–4 (1)	Sammy Melvin	DQ	10 (12)	Feb 13, 1923	47th Regiment Armory, New York City, New York, US	
34	Win	25–4–4 (1)	Al Kale	PTS	12	Feb 2, 1923	2nd Naval Militia Armory, New York City, New York, US	
33	Win	24–4–4 (1)	Ruby Stein	PTS	12	Jan 16, 1923	47th Regiment Armory, New York City, New York, US	
32	Loss	23–4–4 (1)	Petey Hayes	KO	6 (?)	Jan 6, 1923	9th Coast Defense Armory, New York City, New York, US	
31	Loss	23–3–4 (1)	Young Diamond	PTS	8	Dec 21, 1922	102nd Medical Regiment Armory, New York City, New York, US	
30	Win	23–2–4 (1)	Al Kale	PTS	12	Nov 21, 1922	47th Regiment Armory, New York City, New York, US	Won vacant National Guard featherweight title
29	Win	22–2–4 (1)	Young Diamond	PTS	12	Nov 16, 1922	102nd Medical Regiment Armory, New York City, New York, US	
28	Draw	21–2–4 (1)	Kid Butler	PTS	12	Nov 4, 1922	2nd Field Artillery Reg. Armory, New York City, New York, US	
27	Win	21–2–3 (1)	Thaddeus 'Kid' Bacon	KO	4 (?)	Nov 1, 1922	47th Regiment Armory, New York City, New York, US	
26	Win	20–2–3 (1)	Young Diamond	PTS	12	Oct 21, 1922	9th Coast Defense Armory, New York City, New York, US	
25	Win	19–2–3 (1)	Red K.O. O'Neil	KO	7 (?)	Oct 12, 1922	102nd Medical Regiment Armory, New York City, New York, US	
24	Win	18–2–3 (1)	Jack McCoy	TKO	4 (?)	Sep 29, 1922	New York City, New York, US	
23	Loss	17–2–3 (1)	Jimmy Hutchinson	TD	6 (6)	Aug 19, 1922	Ridgewood Grove, New York City, New York, US	
22	Win	17–1–3 (1)	Joe Stanley	PTS	6	Jul 29, 1922	Ridgewood Grove SC, New York City, New York, US	
21	Win	16–1–3 (1)	Battling Burke	KO	2 (10)	Jul 13, 1922	47th Regiment Armory, New York City, New York, US	
20	Win	15–1–3 (1)	Joe Eppy	PTS	12	Jun 15, 1922	47th Regiment Armory, New York City, New York, US	
19	Draw	14–1–3 (1)	Sammy Kirsch	PTS	12	Apr 22, 1922	47th Regiment Armory, New York City, New York, US	
18	Draw	14–1–2 (1)	Sammy Marco	PTS	12	Apr 15, 1922	47th Regiment Armory, New York City, New York, US	
17	Loss	14–1–1 (1)	Willie Allen	PTS	12	Mar 25, 1922	Ridgewood Grove SC, New York City, New York, US	
16	Win	14–0–1 (1)	Joe Mickel	PTS	10	Feb 11, 1922	47th Regiment Armory, New York City, New York, US	
15	Win	13–0–1 (1)	Joe Eppy	PTS	12	Feb 4, 1922	47th Regiment Armory, New York City, New York, US	
14	Win	12–0–1 (1)	Joe Eppy	PTS	10	Jan 21, 1922	69th Regiment Armory, New York City, New York, US	
13	Win	11–0–1 (1)	Mike Dundee	KO	2 (?)	Dec 31, 1921	47th Battalion Corps of Engineer, New York City, New York, US	
12	Draw	10–0–1 (1)	Frankie O'Neill	PTS	4	Dec 15, 1921	New York City, New York, US	Exact date and location not known at this time
11	ND	10–0 (1)	Joe Eppy	ND	12	Dec 3, 1921	47th Battalion Corps of Engineer, New York City, New York, US	No result to date
10	Win	10–0	Sergeant Marshall	TKO	4 (10)	Nov 25, 1921	15th Regiment Armory, New York City, New York, US	
9	Win	9–0	Harry Lamar	PTS	10	Nov 19, 1921	47th Regiment Armory, New York City, New York, US	
8	Win	8–0	Ed Monroe	KO	3 (?)	Nov 5, 1921	47th Regiment Armory, New York City, New York, US	
7	Win	7–0	Harry Gardner	DQ	2 (4)	Oct 8, 1921	47th Regiment Armory, New York City, New York, US	
6	Win	6–0	Willie Conway	PTS	10	Oct 1, 1921	47th Regiment Armory, New York City, New York, US	
5	Win	5–0	Jesse Kaufman	KO	2 (?)	Sep 17, 1921	47th Regiment Armory, New York City, New York, US	
4	Win	4–0	Kid Specks	KO	3 (4)	Sep 9, 1921	15th Regiment Armory, New York City, New York, US	
3	Win	3–0	Kid Cunningham	PTS	4	Sep 2, 1921	15th Regiment Armory, New York City, New York, US	
2	Win	2–0	Joe Mastara	PTS	10	Aug 1, 1921	New York City, New York, US	Exact date and location unknown
1	Win	1–0	Nate Ripon	KO	5 (?)	Feb 14, 1921	New York City, New York, US	Exact date and location unknown; Professional debut
