= Zamarripa =

Zamarripa is a Basque language surname. Notable people with it include:

- Angel Zamarripa (1912–1990), Mexican cartoonist
- JoCasta Zamarripa (born 1976), American politician
- Rafael Zamarripa (born 1942), Mexican painter
- Sam Zamarripa (born 1952), American politician
- Vanessa Zamarripa (born 1990), American gymnast

== See also ==
- Zamarramala
