= Lennart Bohman =

Swedish boxer

Medal record

Men's amateur boxing

Representing Sweden

European Amateur Championships
Gold medal – first place	1927 Berlin	Flyweight

Lennart A. Bohman (May 27, 1909 – October 11, 1979) was a Swedish boxer who competed in the 1928 Summer Olympics.

In 1928 he was eliminated in the second round of the flyweight class after losing his fight to Hubert Ausböck.
