= Juan José Trillo =

Argentine boxer

Juan José Trillo (born April 17, 1909, date of death unknown) was an Argentine boxer who competed in the 1928 Summer Olympics and in the 1932 Summer Olympics. He was born in Buenos Aires. In 1928 he was eliminated in the second round of the flyweight class after losing his fight to Cuthbert Taylor of Great Britain. Four years later he was eliminated in the first round of the flyweight class after losing his fight to Werner Spannagel of Germany.

== 1928 Olympic results ==
Below is the record of Juan José Trillo, an Argentinian flyweight boxer who competed at the 1928 Amsterdam Olympics:

- Round of 32: bye
- Round of 16: lost to Cuthbert Taylor (Great Britain) by decision

== 1932 Olympic results ==
Below is the record of Juan José Trillo, an Argentinian flyweight boxer who competed at the 1932 Los Angeles Olympics:

- Round of 16: lost to Werner Spannagel (Germany) by decision
