= Jean Kieffer =

Luxembourgish boxer

Personal information
- Nationality: Luxembourgish
- Born: 9 June 1909 Colmar-Berg, Luxembourg
- Died: 1 December 1961 (aged 52) Esch-sur-Alzette, Luxembourg

Sport
- Sport: Boxing

Jean Kieffer (6 June 1909 – 1 December 1961) was a Luxembourgish boxer. He competed in the men's flyweight event at the 1928 Summer Olympics.
