= Cuthbert Taylor =

Welsh boxer (1909–1977)

Personal information
- Nationality: British
- Born: 11 December 1909 Merthyr Tydfil, Wales, United Kingdom
- Died: 15 November 1977 (aged 67)
- Height: 5 ft 10 in (1.78 m)
- Weight: Bantamweight

Boxing career

Boxing record
- Total fights: 247
- Wins: 151
- Win by KO: 14
- Losses: 69
- Draws: 22

Cuthbert Taylor (11 December 1909 – 15 November 1977) was a Welsh boxer who competed for Great Britain in the 1928 Summer Olympics. He was the Welsh Bantamweight Champion.

== Amateur boxing career ==
According to boxing historian, Gareth Jones, Cuthbert Taylor began boxing as a youth, fighting with his father, at the boxing booths in travelling fairs that toured the country. He won the 1922 Amateur Boxing Association British flyweight title, when boxing out of the Cardiff Gabalfa ACC, and was selected to represent Britain in the 1928 Summer Olympics in Amsterdam. He defeated Juan José Trillo of Argentina but he was eliminated in the quarter-finals of the flyweight class after losing his fight to the upcoming silver medallist Armand Apell.

== 1928 Olympic results ==
- Round of 32: bye
- Round of 16: defeated Juan Jose Trillo (Argentina) by decision
- Quarterfinal: lost to Armand Apell (France) by decision

== Professional boxing career ==
On returning to Wales he turned professional fighting Manchester's Jackie Brown at Merthyr Tydfil on 29 December 1928. The contest ended in a draw, which was followed by his first professional win, over Lud Abella and a loss to Phineas John. By May 1929 Taylor was invited to fight at the National Sporting Club in London, losing by points in a 15-round match against Bert Kirby.

On 29 July 1929, Taylor had moved up a weight division, and challenged Dan Dando for the Welsh Bantamweight Championship, defeating Dando on points. His reign was short lived when he lost the title just over a month later to Phineas John. Taylor challenged twice more for the Welsh Bantamweight belt, failing on both occasions, both against Stanley Jehu, first for the vacant title in 1930 and then an unsuccessful challenge in 1931.

In total Taylor fought 247 professional bouts, with 151 wins, 69 losses and 22 draws. In all his fights he was knocked out only once, by Tommy Hyams at Selhurst Park in 1932. None of Taylor's fights were conducted outside Britain. Including amateur fights he recorded over 250 victories.

== Colour bar ==
Taylor was born in Wales to an English-born father of Jamaican descent, and Welsh mother. Between 1911 and 1948 the British Boxing Board of Control (BBBofC) operated a colour bar which prevented non-white boxers from competing for British titles. As his father was black, Taylor was deemed "not white enough to be British" and was denied the opportunity to challenge for any professional national belts, despite being the first black boxer to represent Great Britain at the Olympics.

In 2021, as part of Black History Month, a plaque was unveiled at The Court House in Merthyr Tydfil, where Taylor used to train. His family took this opportunity to demand an apology from the BBBofC, for their discriminatory actions of the past towards Taylor and the other black boxers who were barred from competing for the British titles. Their cause was championed by Merthyr Tydfil and Rhymney Member of Parliament, Gerald Jones, who raised the issue on the floor of the House of Commons on 27 October.

A play entitled "The Fight" staged by the Welsh theatre company Theatr na nÓg prompted more than 300 Welsh schoolchildren to write to the British Boxing Board of Control to ask for an apology for having banned Taylor from fighting for the title on the grounds of his skin colour.
