= Marcel Sartos =

Belgian boxer

Personal information
- Nationality: Belgian
- Born: 10 May 1909

Sport
- Sport: Boxing

Marcel Sartos (born 10 May 1909, date of death unknown) was a Belgian boxer. He competed in the men's flyweight event at the 1928 Summer Olympics. During the Olympics, he defeated Hyman Miller. Hyman's elimination caused controversy, and Jacob Stumpff petitioned General MacArthur to withdraw the American team from the games.
