= Frankie Martin =

Canadian boxer

Frank Bickerdike Martin (né Salvagio; February 25, 1908 – March 12, 1988) was a Canadian boxer who competed in the 1928 Summer Olympics in the flyweight division.

He was born in Montreal.

In 1928 he was eliminated in the second round of the flyweight class after losing his fight to the eventual silver medalist Armand Apell.

== 1928 Olympic results ==
Below is the record of Frankie Martin, a Canadian flyweight boxer who competed at the 1928 Amsterdam Olympics:

- Round of 32: bye
- Round of 16: lost to Armand Apell (France) by decision
