= Hyman Miller =

American boxer

Hyman "Hymie" Miller (April 20, 1911 – October 1977) was an American boxer who competed in the 1928 Summer Olympics.

He was born in Pittsburgh, Pennsylvania and died in Rochester, New York.

In 1928, he was controversially eliminated in the first round of the flyweight class after losing a decision to Marcel Sartos of Belgium. In response, the American team threatened to withdraw from the competition.

== 1928 Olympic results ==
Below is the record of Hyman Miller, an American flyweight boxer who competed at the 1928 AMsterdam Olympics:

- Round of 32: lost to Marcel Sartos (Belgium) by decision
