= Armand Apell =

French boxer

Olympic medal record

Men's Boxing
| Silver medal – second place | 1928 Amsterdam | Flyweight |

Armand Apell (January 16, 1905 in Strasbourg, German Empire – July 3, 1990) was a French boxer. He competed in the 1928 Summer Olympics.

In 1928, Apell won the silver medal in the flyweight class after losing the final against Antal Kocsis.

== 1928 Olympic results ==
Below are the bouts Armand Apell (France) fought in the flyweight division at the 1928 Amsterdam Olympics:

- Round of 16: defeated Frankie Martin (Canada) on points
- Quarterfinal: defeated Cuthbert Taylor (Great Britain) on points
- Semifinal: defeated Baddie Lebanon (South Africa) on points
- Final: lost to Antal Kocsis (Hungary) on points (was awarded silver medal)
