= Boxing at the 1928 Summer Olympics – Flyweight =

Boxing competitions

Men's flyweight boxing at the Games of the IX Olympiad
- Venue: Krachtsportgebouw
- Date: August 7–11, 1928
- Competitors: 19 from 19 nations

Medalists
1st place, gold medalist(s)		Antal Kocsis	Hungary
2nd place, silver medalist(s)		Armand Apell	France
3rd place, bronze medalist(s)		Carlo Cavagnoli	Italy

The men's flyweight event was part of the boxing programme at the 1928 Summer Olympics. The weight class was the lightest contested, and allowed boxers of up to 112 pounds (50.8 kilograms). The competition was held from Tuesday, August 7, 1928, to Saturday, August 11, 1928.

== Results ==
The competition started with a controversial decision in the first round, when the American Hyman Miller was declared a surprise loser by points. The American boxing team in protest wanted to withdraw all its competitors. But Douglas MacArthur, at that time President of the U.S. Olympic Committee, wouldn't allow it, because "Americans never quit."

Round of 32; August 7
Marcel Sartos (BEL)	PTS
Hyman Miller (USA)	L
Alfredo Gaona (MEX)	PTS
Jean Kieffer (LUX)	L
Nikolaos Fexis (GRE)	PTS
José Turra (CHI)	L

Round of 16; August 8
Cuthbert Taylor (GBR)	PTS
Juan José Trillo (ARG)	L
Armand Apell (FRA)	PTS
Frankie Martin (CAN)	L
Baddie Lebanon (RSA)	PTS
Olav Nielsen (NOR)	L
Ben Bril (NED)	PTS
Myles McDonagh (IRL)	L
Antal Kocsis (HUN)	PTS
José Villanova (ESP)	L
Hubert Ausböck (GER)	PTS
Lennart Bohman (SWE)	L
Carlo Cavagnoli (ITA)	PTS
Marcel Sartos (BEL)	L
Alfredo Gaona (MEX)	PTS
Nikolaos Fexis (GRE)	L

Quarterfinals; August 9
Cuthbert Taylor (GBR)	L
Armand Apell (FRA)	PTS
Baddie Lebanon (RSA)	PTS
Ben Bril (NED)	L
Antal Kocsis (HUN)	PTS
Hubert Ausböck (GER)	L
Carlo Cavagnoli (ITA)	PTS
Alfredo Gaona (MEX)	L

Semifinals; August 10
Armand Apell (FRA)	PTS
Baddie Lebanon (RSA)	L
Antal Kocsis (HUN)	PTS
Carlo Cavagnoli (ITA)	L

Final; August 11
Antal Kocsis (HUN)	PTS
Armand Apell (FRA)	L
Bronze medal bout
Carlo Cavagnoli (ITA)	PTS
Baddie Lebanon (RSA)	L
