= José Villanova =

Spanish boxer

Personal information
- Nationality: Spanish
- Born: 20 March 1909; Barcelona, Spain

Sport
- Sport: Boxing

José Villanova (born 20 March 1909, date of death unknown) was a Spanish boxer. He competed in the men's flyweight event at the 1928 Summer Olympics.
