= Nikolaos Fexis =

Greek boxer

Personal information
- Nationality: Greek
- Born: 1906 Lefkada, Greece

Sport
- Sport: Boxing

Nikolaos Fexis (born 1906, date of death unknown) was a Greek boxer. He competed in the men's flyweight event at the 1928 Summer Olympics.
