= Alfredo Gaona =

Mexican boxer (1911–1986)

Personal information
- Born: 25 November 1911; Mexico City, Mexico
- Died: 9 April 1986 (aged 74)

Sport
- Sport: Boxing

Alfredo Gaona (25 November 1911 – 9 April 1986) was a Mexican boxer. He competed in the men's flyweight event at the 1928 Summer Olympics.
