= Tom Campbell (footballer, born 1924) =

Australian rules footballer

Personal information
- Full name: Tom Campbell
- Born: 26 July 1924
- Died: 4 July 1990 (aged 65)
- Original team: Glen Iris / East Malvern
- Height: 191 cm (6 ft 3 in)
- Weight: 94 kg (207 lb)

Playing career^{1}
Years	Club	Games (Goals)
1943–45	Hawthorn	27 (12)
- ^{1} Playing statistics correct to the end of 1945.

Tom Campbell (26 July 1924 – 4 July 1990) was an Australian rules footballer who played with Hawthorn in the Victorian Football League (VFL).
