= Ingy Norman =

Australian rules footballer, born 1911

Personal information
- Full name: Ingwald William Bernard Norman
- Born: 2 April 1911; Newport, Wales
- Died: 7 July 1990 (aged 79)
- Original team: East Brunswick
- Height: 185 cm (6 ft 1 in)
- Weight: 84 kg (185 lb)

Playing career^{1}
| Years | Club | Games (Goals) |
| 1938 | Fitzroy | 1 (0) |
- ^{1} Playing statistics correct to the end of 1938.

Ingy Norman (2 April 1911 – 7 July 1990) was an Australian rules footballer who played with Fitzroy in the Victorian Football League (VFL).

== Family ==
The second son of Norwegian-born Jonas Mattias Elija Svehaug (1886–1968) and Sarah Ann Curran (1886–1968), Ingvald Svehaug was born in Newport, Wales (the city of his mother's birth) on 2 April 1911. The family took the anglicised surname Norman when they emigrated to Australia in 1914. He was the younger brother of fellow one-game Fitzroy player Jack Norman.

== Football ==
After a single senior game with Fitzroy in 1938, Norman transferred to Preston where he played in the 1939 & 1940 seasons.
