= Guglielmo Giovannini =

Italian footballer

Personal information
- Date of birth: 17 December 1925
- Place of birth: Bologna, Italy
- Date of death: 17 July 1990 (aged 64)
- Place of death: Bologna, Italy
- Position: Defender

Senior career*
Years	Team	Apps	(Gls)
1946–1958	Bologna	253	(2)
1959–1960	Maceratese	14	(0)

International career
1948	Italy	2	(0)
- * Club domestic league appearances and goals

Guglielmo Giovannini (Italian pronunciation: [ɡuʎˈʎɛlmo dʒovanˈniːni]; 17 December 1925 – 17 July 1990) was an Italian footballer who played as a defender. He competed in the men's tournament at the 1948 Summer Olympics.
