= Loyal Oakley =

Australian rules footballer

Personal information
- Full name: Loyal Percival Oakley
- Born: 20 November 1898; Mount Lyell (Tasmania)
- Died: 4 July 1990 (aged 91); Hobart, Tasmania
- Original team: Lefroy / Paddington
- Height: 170 cm (5 ft 7 in)
- Weight: 66 kg (146 lb)

Playing career^{1}
Years	Club	Games (Goals)
1923	Richmond	2 (0)
- ^{1} Playing statistics correct to the end of 1923.

Loyal Percival Oakley (20 November 1898 – 4 July 1990) was an Australian rules footballer who played with Richmond in the Victorian Football League (VFL). He was recruited from Sydney club Paddington but was originally from Tasmania.
