= Allan Opsahl =

American ice hockey player

- Born: September 27, 1924 Minneapolis, MN, USA
- Died: July 19, 1990 (aged 65) Santa Rosa, California, USA
- Height: 5 ft 10 in (178 cm)
- Weight: 180 lb (82 kg; 12 st 12 lb)
- Position: Defense
- National team: United States
- Playing career: 1947–1952

Allan William "Al" Opsahl (September 27, 1924 – July 19, 1990) was an American ice hockey defenseman who competed in ice hockey at the 1948 Winter Olympics which took place in St. Moritz, Switzerland.

Opsahl was a member of the Amateur Hockey Association (AHA) team that represented the United States at the 1948 Winter Olympics in St. Moritz, where he played all eight games. Although the American team finished fourth on the ice with a 5–3 record, its results were excluded from the official Olympic standings following a dispute over the team's eligibility involving the United States Olympic authorities, the LIHG, the IOC and the Swiss organizers.

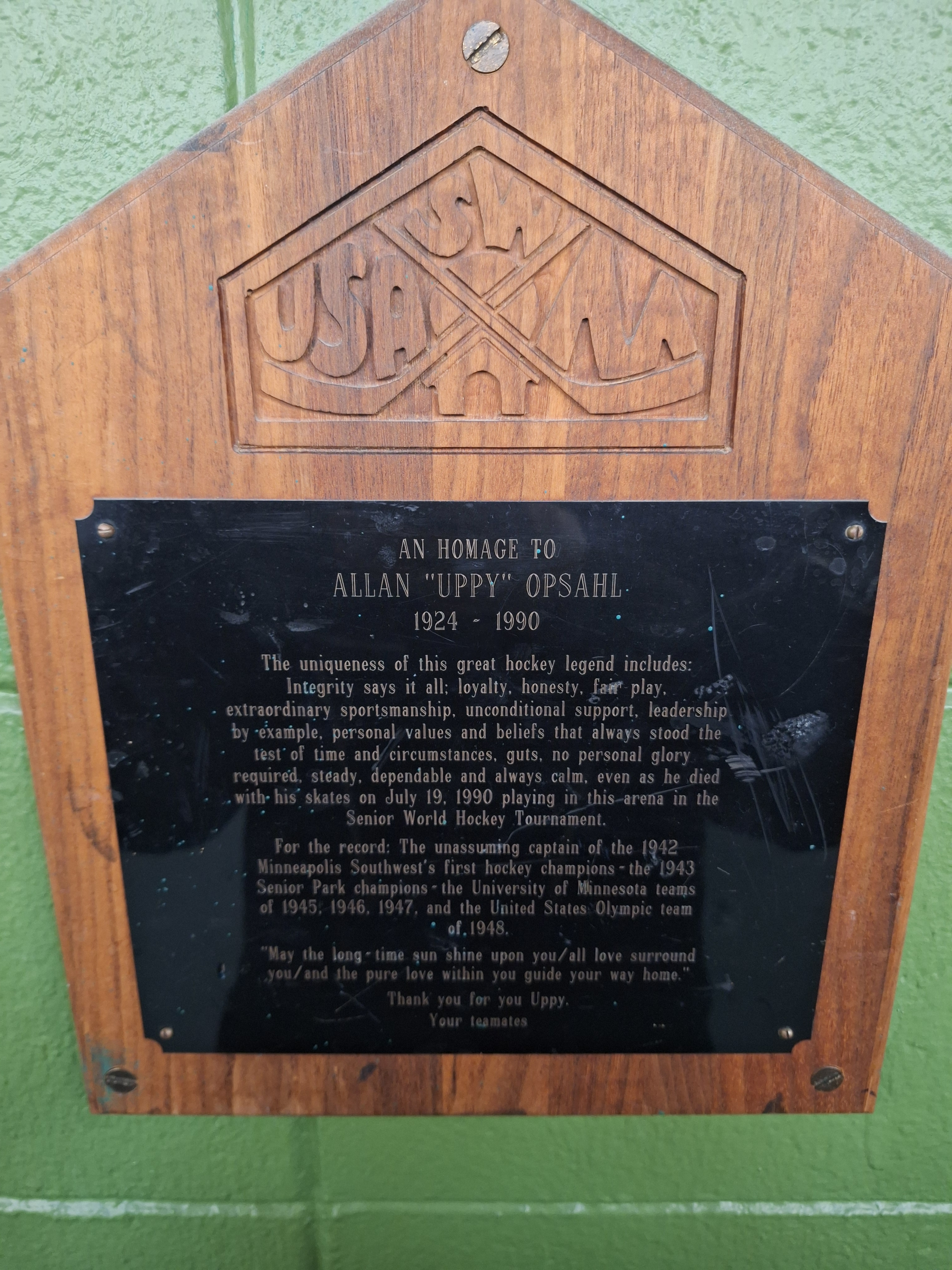
Memorial plaque for Allan Opsahl, ice jokey player who died at this location on July 19th, 1990.

The plaque commemorates Opsahl's hockey career and his connection to the local hockey community. Opsahl played defense for the University of Minnesota from 1944 to 1947 and served as one of the team's captains during his final three seasons. He represented the United States in ice hockey at the 1948 Winter Olympics in St. Moritz, appearing in all eight games and recording one goal and one assist. The United States finished fourth in the tournament with a 5-3 record. The plaque states that Opsahl died while playing in a senior hockey tournament at the arena on July 19, 1990.
