= Emile Nurenberg =

Luxembourgish footballer

Personal information
- Date of birth: 12 December 1918
- Date of death: 9 July 1990 (aged 71)
- Position: Forward

International career
Years	Team	Apps	(Gls)
1948–1949	Luxembourg	2	(0)

Emile Nurenberg (12 December 1918 – 9 July 1990) was a Luxembourgish footballer. He played in two matches for the Luxembourg national football team from 1948 to 1949. He was also part of Luxembourg's squad for the football tournament at the 1948 Summer Olympics, but he did not play in any matches.
