= Jim Jewitt =

Australian rules footballer

Personal information
- Full name: Jim Jewitt
- Born: 5 February 1933
- Died: 25 July 1990 (aged 57)
- Original team: West Footscray
- Height: 180 cm (5 ft 11 in)
- Weight: 89 kg (196 lb)

Playing career^{1}
Years	Club	Games (Goals)
1955	St Kilda	2 (1)
- ^{1} Playing statistics correct to the end of 1955.

Jim Jewitt (5 February 1933 – 25 July 1990) was an Australian rules footballer who played with St Kilda in the Victorian Football League (VFL).
