= Arnold Quick =

English cricketer (1915–1990)

Personal information
- Full name: Arnold Bertram Quick
- Born: 10 February 1915; Clacton-on-Sea, Essex, England
- Died: 17 July 1990 (aged 75); Frinton-on-Sea, Essex, England
- Batting: Right-handed
- Bowling: Right-arm off-break
- Role: Batter

Domestic team information
- Years: Team
- 1936–1952: Essex
- First-class debut: 22 August 1936 Essex v Nottinghamshire
- Last First-class: 27 August 1952 Essex v Yorkshire

Career statistics
| Competition | FC |
|---|---|
| Matches | 20 |
| Runs scored | 439 |
| Batting average | 13.71 |
| 100s/50s | 0/2 |
| Top score | 57 |
| Balls bowled | 11 |
| Wickets | 0 |
| Bowling average | – |
| 5 wickets in innings | 0 |
| 10 wickets in match | 0 |
| Best bowling | – |
| Catches/stumpings | 13/0 |
- Source: Cricket Archive, 11 April 2020

Arnold Bertram Quick (10 February 1915 – 17 July 1990) was an English cricketer who played first-class cricket from 1936 to 1952.

An exuberant, hard-hitting right-handed batter, noted for the power of his driving, Arnold Quick played 19 matches for Essex. He played most of his first-class cricket before the Second World War, making only two appearances afterwards, in 1948 for the Marylebone Cricket Club and in 1952 for Essex. Quick made 439 runs in his career, at a batting average of 13.71 runs per innings. His best score of 57 was one of two half-centuries. He also played over forty Second XI matches for Essex, captaining the team from 1956 to 1959.

Quick was a director of the International Publishing Company.
