= Wally Milne =

Australian rules footballer, born 1910

Personal information
- Full name: Wallace Charles Milne
- Born: 13 December 1910; Essendon, Victoria
- Died: 31 July 1990 (aged 79)

Playing career^{1}
Years	Club	Games (Goals)
1933–35	Essendon	22 (11)
- ^{1} Playing statistics correct to the end of 1935.

Wallace Charles Milne (13 December 1910 – 31 July 1990) was an Australian rules footballer who played with Essendon in the Victorian Football League (VFL).

Milne later served in the Australian Army during World War II.
