= Maceo Clark =

American baseball player

- Pitcher
- Born: July 9, 1897; Chatham, Virginia, U.S.
- Died: July 29, 1990 (aged 93); Moraine, Ohio, U.S.

Negro league baseball debut
- 1924, for the Washington Potomacs

Last appearance
- 1924, for the Washington Potomacs

Career statistics
- Win–loss record: 0–2
- Earned run average: 13.15
- Strikeouts: 2
- Stats at Baseball Reference

Teams
- Washington Potomacs (1924)

Maceo Richard Clark (July 9, 1897 – July 29, 1990) was an American Negro league pitcher in the 1920s.

A native of Chatham, Virginia, Clark attended Howard University where he played college baseball for the Howard Bison baseball team and was a member of Alpha Phi Alpha. He made his Negro leagues debut in 1923 with the Washington Potomacs, and played three seasons for the club, which moved to Wilmington in 1925.

After his foray into baseball, Clark graduated from Meharry Medical College and settled in Dayton, Ohio to practice medicine. He also served multiple terms as the head of the Dayton chapter of the NAACP and served on the Ohio Board of Regents.

Clark died in a nursing home in Moraine, Ohio in 1990 at age 93.
