= Cai Qiao =

Chinese physiologist and physician

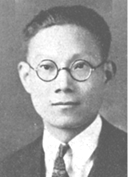
- Born: October 11, 1897; Jieyang, Guangdong, Great Qing
- Died: July 29, 1990 (aged 92); Beijing, China
- Education: University of California; University of Chicago
- Known for: discoverer of the ventral tegmental area
- Scientific career
- Fields: Physiology
- Workplaces: Fudan University; National Shanghai Medical College; Academy of Military Medical Sciences

Cai Qiao or Chiao Tsai (simplified Chinese: 蔡翘; traditional Chinese: 蔡翹; pinyin: Cài Qiào; Wade–Giles: Ts'ai Ch'iao; 11 October 1897 – 29 July 1990) was a Chinese physiologist and physician. Cai is famous for his discovery in the 1920s of the ventral tegmental area, which is also known as the ventral tegmental area of Tsai. He was elected as a member of Academia Sinica in 1948, also a member of Chinese Academy of Sciences in 1955.

== Early life and education ==
Cai finished his psychological training in California University during 1919–1921, then he entered University of Chicago as a postgraduate with Harvey A. Carr's guidance, he also focused on the subjects overlap psychology such as neuroanatomy and physiology during this period, and finally altered his research field towards the latter thenceforth.

== Career ==
Cai returned to China in 1925, and took a post of professor of physiology at Fudan University. He transferred to National Shanghai Medical College two years later. Then he edited the first textbook on physiology for undergraduate in Chinese, which was published in 1929.

Cai went to the United Kingdom and Germany as a senior visit scholar within laboratory of C. Lovatt Evans, and later, Edgar Adrian from 1930–1932. Cai continued his teaching and research in Shanghai, until the beginning of 1937, began to teach at School of Medicine, National Central University.

Cai moved to West China followed the university after the Marco Polo Bridge Incident. He backed to Nanjing since the war over, and appointed as deputy dean of the school in 1948.

After 1949, Cai joined PLA. Since the school moved to Xi'an, he went to Beijing and entered Academy of Military Medical Sciences (AMMS) in 1954 as vice president and chairman of Academic Council. From then on, he gradually laid the foundation of nautical physiology, aviation physiology and space physiology of China. He devoted to neurobiology later in life.

Cai served as the general director of Chinese Association for Physiological Sciences from 1964–1981, then the honours general director until he died in 1990.

Although Cai was humiliated and once exiled to Hengshui, Hebei during the Cultural Revolution, he kept the research.
