= Norm Simpson =

Australian rules footballer, born 1905

Personal information
- Full name: Norm Simpson
- Born: 20 May 1905
- Died: 23 July 1990 (aged 85)
- Height: 170 cm (5 ft 7 in)
- Weight: 65 kg (143 lb)

Playing career^{1}
Years	Club	Games (Goals)
1925–32	Essendon	77 (29)
- ^{1} Playing statistics correct to the end of 1932.

Norm Simpson (20 May 1905 – 23 July 1990) was a former Australian rules footballer who played with Essendon in the Victorian Football League (VFL).
