= Cliff Colling =

Australian rules footballer, born 1912

Personal information
- Full name: Cliff Colling
- Born: 18 December 1912
- Died: 29 July 1990 (aged 77)
- Original team: Kew
- Height: 171 cm (5 ft 7 in)
- Weight: 64 kg (141 lb)

Playing career^{1}
Years	Club	Games (Goals)
1931	Hawthorn	1 (1)
- ^{1} Playing statistics correct to the end of 1931.

Cliff Colling (18 December 1912 – 29 July 1990) was an Australian rules footballer who played with Hawthorn in the Victorian Football League (VFL).
