= Hubert Ausböck =

German boxer

Hubert Ausböck (8 January 1908 – 1 February 1989) was a German boxer who competed in the 1928 Summer Olympics. He was born in Munich. He participated in 23 fights as a professional, winning 17 of those along with 3 draws and 3 fights also resulting in a loss. In 1928 he was eliminated in the quarter-finals of the flyweight class after losing his fight to the upcoming gold medalist Antal Kocsis.
