= Ted Hoppen =

Australian rules footballer, born 1918

Personal information
- Full name: Edgar Harold Hoppen
- Born: 17 March 1918; Geelong, Victoria
- Died: 5 July 1990 (aged 72)
- Original team: Queenscliff
- Height: 170 cm (5 ft 7 in)
- Weight: 76 kg (168 lb)
- Position: Back Pocket / half back

Playing career^{1}
Years	Club	Games (Goals)
1939–41	St Kilda	41 (6)
- ^{1} Playing statistics correct to the end of 1941.

Edgar Harold Hoppen (17 March 1918 – 5 July 1990) was an Australian rules footballer who played with St Kilda in the Victorian Football League (VFL).

== Family ==
The son of Alexander Hoppen (1884–1957), and Sydney Daisy Hoppen (1887–1940), née Abbott, Edgar Harold Hoppen was born at Geelong, Victoria on 17 March 1918.

He married Joan Marie Morgan (1923–1989), in Sydney, on 1 September 1948.

== Football ==
=== St Kilda (VFL) ===
He played 41 games with St Kilda over three seasons (1939–1941).

=== North Shore (SFL) ===
He played with the North Shore Football Club in the Sydney Football League for three seasons: 1946–1948.

=== NSW Representative ===
In his three seasons with North Shore he also played in 14 representative matches for New South Wales.
