= Albert Strange (footballer) =

Australian rules footballer, born 1905

Personal information
- Full name: Albert Strange
- Born: 14 June 1905
- Died: 21 July 1990 (aged 85)

Playing career^{1}
Years	Club	Games (Goals)
1926	St Kilda	1 (0)
- ^{1} Playing statistics correct to the end of 1926.

Albert Strange (14 June 1905 – 21 July 1990) was an Australian rules footballer who played for the St Kilda Football Club in the Victorian Football League (VFL).
