= Carlo Cavagnoli =

Italian boxer (1907–1990)

Olympic medal record

Men's Boxing
Bronze medal – third place	1928 Amsterdam	Flyweight

Carlo Cavagnoli (February 21, 1907 – July 20, 1990) was an Italian boxer who competed in the 1928 Summer Olympics. In 1928 he won the bronze medal in the flyweight class after winning the third-place bout against Baddie Lebanon of South Africa. He was born in Milan.

== 1928 Olympic results ==
- Round of 16: defeated Marcel Sartos (Belgium) on points
- Quarterfinal: defeated Alfredo Gaona (Mexico) on points
- Semifinal: lost to Antal Kocsis (Hungary) on points
- Bronze Medal Bout: defeated Baddie Lebanon (South Africa) on points (was awarded bronze medal)
