= Ángel Zamarripa =

Mexican cartoonist and watercolor artist

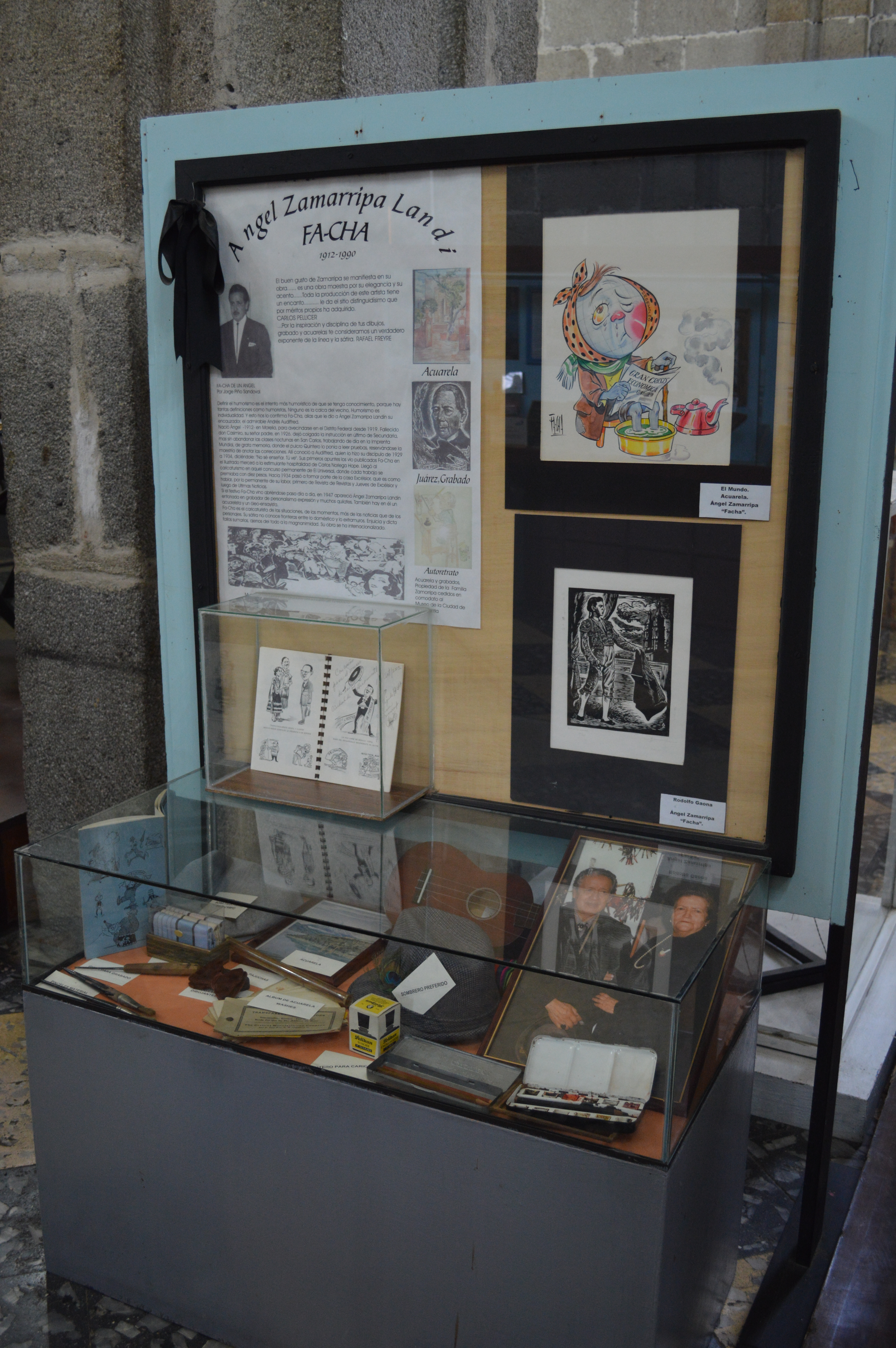
Display dedicated to the artist at the City Museum of Huamantla

Angel Zamarripa Landi (November 16, 1912 – July 6, 1990) was a Mexican cartoonist and watercolor artist, best known for his satirical work which appeared in Mexican newspapers and magazines for over fifty years. His work was exhibited in Mexico and abroad and he was a founding member of the Sociedad Mexicana de Grabadores.

== Life ==
Zamarripa was born in Morelia, Michoacán on November 16, 1912. He completed high school in Mexico City and then enrolled into the Academy of San Carlos in 1929, studying under Germán Gedovius, Fidias Elizondo, Sóstenes Ortega, Francisco de la Torre and Pastor Velázquez. During this time he worked at the Imprenta Mundial publishing house, where he met illustrator Andrés Audiffred, who taught him how to illustrate comics.

In 1946, he continued his training at the Escuela de las Artes del Libro, where he learned engraving from Carlos Alvarado Lang, Pedro Castelar and Francisco Díaz de León.

He was married to Carmen Perez, which whom he had 2 children and 2 granddaughters.

He died in Mexico City on July 6, 1990 of kidney failure.

== Career ==
Angel Zamarripa was one of Mexico's best-known cartoonists in the 20th century. He began his professional career in 1927 working for El Ilustrado magazine under the name of “Fa-cha.” In 1934, he began working for Excélsior, where he remained for over fifty years. His cartoons were also regularly published other publications such as Ultimas Noticias, Jueves de Excelsior and Revista de Revistas.

Starting in 1948, he exhibited his graphic work individually and collective in Mexico the United States, Asia, Europe and South America. He was also a watercolor painter and exhibited his works of Mexican landscapes mostly in the United States and Europe.

In 1947 he founded the Sociedad Mexicana de Grabadores with José Julio Rodríguez and Amador Lugo Guadarrama. He also edited the organization's magazine called “Estampa.” In addition, he was a member of Xylon, the International Society of Engravers based in Switzerland, the Salón Nacional de Grabado, the Salón de la Plástica Mexicana, the Cartoonists Club and the Mexican Society of Watercolorists.

His other activities included an advertising seminar from 1967 to 1969 at the Escuela Nacional de Artes Gráficas and collaboration on a column with Henry Loubet, Jr. with the two signing as “Tin” and Ton.”

Despite the satirical nature of much of his work, he received recognition from politicians such as former U.S. president Lyndon B. Johnson and his wife Lady Bird Johnson.

== Artistry ==
Zamarripa is best known for his graphic work, which is less emotional than that of others in his field. He was more immersed in the craft aspect, especially lithography, wood and linoleum print. He signed his work under various names including “Fa-Cha” and some under Angel Landi.

Although he created some characters such as Thorson (a parody of Tarzan) as well as Hanz and Fritz, Jorge Piño Sandoval called him a “cartoonist of situations, of moments, more than of the latest news than of characters.”

Zamarripa's graphic style was satirical. Piño Sandoval stated that Zamarripa's work made “summary judgments and harsh rulings, totally devoid of any trace of magnanimity.” The artist himself stated that “The cartoon is a serious business, a very powerful weapon. There have been cases in other countries where cartoons have so influenced people that, as a result of the information contained in the drawing, prominent figures have been overthrown.”
