= Baddie Lebanon =

South African boxer (1910–1986)

Henry Lebanon
- Born: 10 October 1910; Johannesburg
- Died: 1986 (aged 75–76)
- Occupation: Boxer

Henry "Baddie" Lebanon (10 October 1910 – c. 1986) was a South African boxer who competed in the 1928 Summer Olympics. He was born in Johannesburg. His nickname is also spelled as "Buddy". In 1928, he finished fourth in the flyweight class after losing the bronze medal bout to Carlo Cavagnoli.
