= Lithuania at the 1928 Summer Olympics =

- IOC code: LTU
- NOC: Lithuanian National Olympic Committee

in Amsterdam
- Competitors: 12 in 4 sports
- Medals: Gold 0 Silver 0 Bronze 0 Total 0

Summer Olympics appearances (overview)
- 1924; 1928; 1932–1988; 1992; 1996; 2000; 2004; 2008; 2012; 2016; 2020; 2024

Other related appearances
- Russian Empire (1908–1912); Soviet Union (1952–1988)

Lithuania competed at the 1928 Summer Olympics in Amsterdam, Netherlands. After the disappointing debut in the 1924 Summer Olympics, Lithuania was better prepared for the games in Amsterdam. In 1926 it organized the first national Olympics (Lithuanian: Lietuvos sporto šventė). Lithuania sent 12 athletes to compete in 4 sports: athletics, boxing, cycling, and weightlifting. The best result was achieved by boxer Juozas Vinča, who shared 5th–8th places.

Lithuania did not appear in the Olympics again in 1932 and 1936, as the country after 1940 when it was occupied by the Soviet Union, Nazi Germany, and the subsequent re-annexation by the Soviet Union, Lithuania wouldn't be able to participate in the next Summer Olympics in 1992 after the restoration of independence in 1990.

== Athletics ==
Haris Šveminas (credited as H. Schwemminas in the official report) competed in men's 100 m and 200 m events. In 100 metres he finished 5th in 12th heat of the first round and did not advance to the semifinals. He shared 63–71 places among 75 competitors. In 200 metres Šveminas was third in the 9th heat, but that was also not enough to advance. In this event he shared 31–44 places among 59 competitors.

Julius Petraitis competed in men's 5,000 m event. He was tenth in 2nd heat and did not advance. Adolfas Akelaitis jumped 160 cm in men's high jump and took the last place. Viktoras Ražaitis competed in men's javelin throw. His result (51.16 metres) secured him 26th place among 28 competitors.

Paulina Radziulytė became the first woman to represent Lithuania in the Olympics. She competed in women's 800 metres. She placed last in the 3rd heat and 23rd–24th overall among 25 athletes. She was also registered for 100 metres, but did not enter the competition.

Men
Track & road events

Athlete	Event	Heat		Quarterfinal		Semifinal		Final	
Athlete	Event	Result	Rank	Result	Rank	Result	Rank	Result	Rank
Julius Petraitis	5000 m	NT	10	Did not advance					
Haris Šveminas	100 m	NT	5	Did not advance					
Haris Šveminas	200 m	NT	3	Did not advance					

Field events

Athlete	Event	Qualification		Final	
Athlete	Event	Distance	Position	Distance	Position
Adolfas Akelaitis	High jump	1.60	33	Did not advance	
Viktoras Ražaitis	Javelin throw	51.16	26	Did not advance	

Women
Track & road events

Athlete	Event	Heat		Quarterfinal		Semifinal		Final	
Athlete	Event	Result	Rank	Result	Rank	Result	Rank	Result	Rank
Paulina Radziulytė	800 m	NT	9	Did not advance					

== Boxing ==
Lithuania was represented by two boxers: Juozas Vinča in the light heavyweight (up to 79.4 kg / 175 lb) and Kazys Markevičius in the lightweight competitions (up to 61.2 kg / 135 lb). Vinča won the first match against Robert Fouquet from France and advanced to the quarterfinals. He was then knocked out by Donald McCorkindale from South Africa and eliminated from further competition. Vinča thus shared 5th–8th places with boxers from Canada, Ireland, and Great Britain. Markevičius lost his first game to Georges Carcagne from France and did not advance in the competition.

Men

Athlete	Event	1 Round	2 Round	Quarterfinals	Semifinals	Final	
Athlete	Event	Opposition Result	Opposition Result	Opposition Result	Opposition Result	Opposition Result	Rank
Kazys Markevičius	Lightweight	Georges Carcagne (FRA); L	Did not advance				17
Juozas Vinča	Light heavyweight	BYE	Robert Fouquet (FRA); W	Don McCorkindale (RSA); L TKO-2	Did not advance		5

== Cycling ==
In cycling Lithuania was represented by four athletes: Isakas Anolikas (also competed in the 1924 Olympics), Vladas Jankauskas, Jurgis Gedminas, and Tarhumas Murnikas. All four competed in the individual road race (168 kilometre time trial). Anolikas and Jankauskas did not finish the race. Murnikas finished the race in 5 hours 41 minutes and placed 50th among 63 competitors. Gediminas was 55th (5 hours 50 minutes).

=== Road ===
Athlete	Event	Time	Rank
Isakas Anolikas	Men's road race	DNF	
Jurgis Gedminas	Men's road race	5:50:04	55
Vladas Jankauskas	Men's road race	DNF	
Tarhumas Murnikas	Men's road race	5:41:00	50

== Weightlifting ==
Pranas Vitonis, the only Lithuanian weightlifter at the Olympics, competed in men's 75 kg class. He received 275 points and shared 15th–16th places with Ernst Trinkler from Switzerland among 18 competitors.

Men

Athlete	Event	Military Press		Snatch		Clean & jerk		Total	Rank
Athlete	Event	Result	Rank	Result	Rank	Result	Rank	Total	Rank
Povilas Vitonis	75 kg	85	14	85	15	105	18	275	15
