= John Henry Lewis =

American boxer (1914–1974)

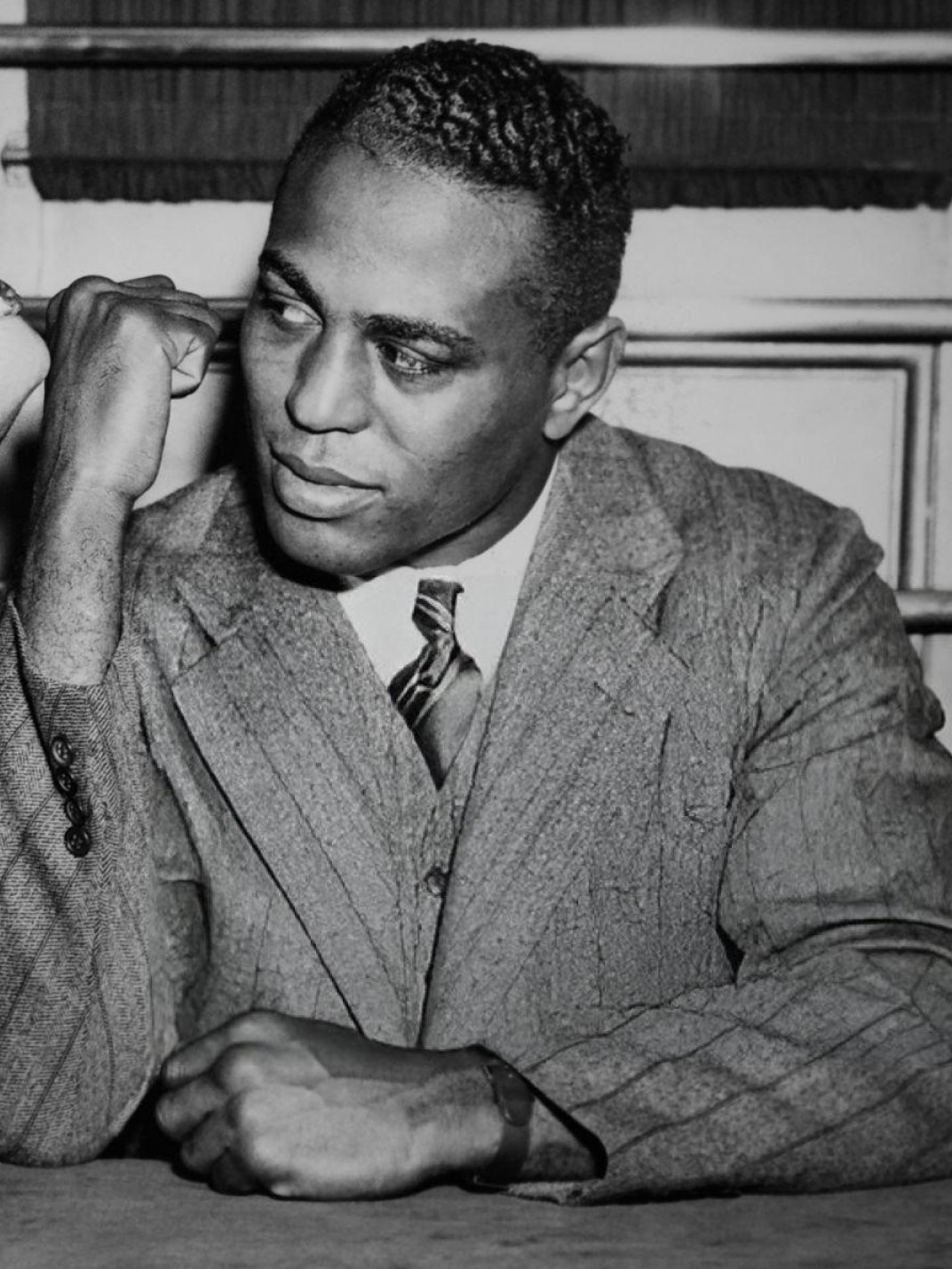
- Lewis in 1939

Personal information
- Nationality: American
- Born: John Henry Lewis; May 1, 1914 Los Angeles, California, U.S.
- Died: April 18, 1974 (aged 59) Berkeley, California, U.S.
- Height: 5 ft 11 in (1.80 m)
- Weight: Light Heavyweight

Boxing career
- Reach: 71 in (180 cm)
- Stance: Orthodox

Boxing record
- Total fights: 117
- Wins: 101
- Win by KO: 58
- Losses: 11
- Draws: 5

John Henry Lewis (May 1, 1914 – April 18, 1974) was an American boxer who held the World Light Heavyweight title from 1935 to 1938. A Hall of Fame member, he was named the 16th greatest light heavyweight of all time by boxing magazine The Ring. His trainer was Larry Amadee, and his managers included Ernie Lira, Larry White, Frank Schuler and Gus Greenlee.

== Early life ==
Lewis was born in Los Angeles on May 4, 1914, to Mattie Drake Foster and John Edward Lewis. The family settled in Phoenix, Arizona, where he grew up and was taught to box at an early age by his father, a former lightweight who ran a Phoenix gym. Lewis claimed a great-uncle was the noted bare-knuckle brawler Tom Molineaux.

Lewis battled in exhibition "midget boxing" matches at the age of five. Turning professional as a welterweight at 14, he gained a reputation for speed and rapidly improving scientific boxing skill.

== Early career ==
Lewis began his professional career in 1928, beating Buster Grant by a four-round decision in Phoenix, where he fought his first fourteen bouts. In 1931, he traveled to Prescott, to fight Sam Terrain on March 11. This proved to be a tragic event, as Terrain later died from the blows received during Lewis' fourth round knockout win.

On July 1, 1931, he won his first title, the USA Arizona State Middleweight Championship, in an eight-round points decision against Lloyd Phillips, in Mesa, Arizona. The crowd violently resented the ruling, possibly as a result of racial basis, but the Arizona Republic called the ruling "eminently just".

Lewis faced future World Heavyweight champion, James J. Braddock on September 21, 1932, defeating him in a ten-round points decision at Civic Auditorium in San Francisco. Though only eighteen and still in school at the time of the fight, he took nine of the ten rounds by wide margins. Braddock forced the fighting to take the seventh round.

Taking a break from his high school studies, Lewis won a ten-round decision over Lou Scozza, a veteran Light Heavyweight contender, on October 26, 1932, in San Francisco. He was awarded six of the ten rounds, despite a half-inch cut over his right eye received in the second. According to most accounts, Scozza had an edge in the fourth and tenth, while the third and ninth were even. Lewis landed cleaner punches and in three rounds sent Scozza back on his heels with strong rights to the jaw. Lewis nearly dropped Scozza in the seventh, and in the eighth scored a terrific right to the jaw that landed him on the ropes.

In 1934, Lewis had 12 bouts, going 9–1–2. On September 20 of that year, he made an unsuccessful attempt at the Pacific Coast Light Heavyweight title in Portland, Oregon, but drew with Young Firpo in ten rounds. The first six rounds were extremely close, but in the seventh, eighth, and ninth, Firpo gained a moderate points margin. In the seventh, Firpo used his unorthodox punches to pull ahead, and in the eighth and ninth, he used aggressive rights and lefts to Lewis's body and chin. In round ten, Lewis rallied with a two-fisted attack to secure the draw decision. When John Henry unexpectedly lowered his punches, a tiring Firpo succumbed to a body attack. Two lefts and a stiff right to the head gained Lewis a slight lead, but Firpo recovered, and the brisk fighting looked even at the final bell.

Light Heavyweight contender Yale Okun became Lewis's third-round technical knockout victim in Madison Square Garden on November 23, 1934. In the first two rounds, Okun made a fair showing and prevented Lewis from gaining a points margin. Okun was first staggered by a whizzing right to the face in the third, and after another of Lewis's rights dropped him for a nine-count, the referee called the fight. This bout, and a previous victory against Lewis, were two of Okun's most important career matches.

Facing Frank Rowsey in San Francisco on May 10, 1935, Lewis won a decisive ten-round points decision in San Francisco. Rowsey, outweighed by eight pounds, lost all but the fourth, but nearly knocked Lewis out in the eighth with a clean right to the jaw. The blow staggered Lewis and spun him around, but he recovered and delivered more than he received by the closing bell. Lewis showed superior ring craft, and aggression in the win.

Lewis quickly knocked out Tom Patrick at Hickey Park in Millvale in the first of a ten-round bout on June 4, 1935. The Pittsburgh audience watched Lewis knock Patrick to the mat within the first minute of fighting for a count of three, and shortly after he arose, he went down for the full count from a left and right to the jaw.

== Taking the World Light Heavyweight Championship, October 1935 ==
Lewis took the World Light Heavyweight Title from Bob Olin on October 31, 1935, in a fifteen-round unanimous decision at the Arena in St. Louis. Due to the Depression and a lack of interest in the Light Heavyweight class, Olin's manager had a difficult time finding a promoter or an audience for the fight, finally settling on a payment of $15,000 to fight Lewis in St. Louis. The meager audience of 9,219 that showed on fight day could not provide enough in receipts to pay Olin half of what he was promised. Olin's trainer, Ray Arcel, later wrote that his boxer lost the nerve to fight Lewis and had to be encouraged to change his mind up to the day of the match.

The fight, however, was spectacular, with Olin showing gameness throughout the fifteen rounds, though outmatched by Lewis. Many in the crowd urged the referee to end the fight in the twelfth, but Olin gamely continued. He came out charging and won the first two rounds with a significant margin in points. In the third, finding his range, Lewis battered Olin with precision lefts to the head and straight rights to the body. Both boxers punched with precision and skill, until the thirteenth when Lewis, struggling for a knockout, inadvertently struck Olin after the bell sounded. Faced with the "machine-like precision" of Lewis, Olin lost twelve rounds, while managing to keep two even. Olin, with the will of a former champion, courageously remained on his feet through the entire fifteen rounds, refusing to suffer a knockdown.

In his next fight on November 29, 1935, Lewis lost to Maxie Rosenbloom in a close, dull, 10-round non-title decision at Dreamland Auditorium in San Francisco. Lewis may have taken the fifth, but for his low blow penalties. One reporter scored five for Rosenbloom, three for Lewis, and two even. Rosenbloom's cautious strategy of striking a blow and then clinching bored many ringside, but demonstrated experience as he adjusted for the talent of his younger opponent. Lewis's strategy centered on a body attack, which he executed most effectively in the second, eighth and ninth rounds. In the tenth round, Lewis tried for a knockout, but was rebuffed by the scientific skill of Rosenbloom, who blocked his attacks and showered him with blows. Maxie gained his winning points advantage in the final round, though the resulting decision failed to please the crowd. Lewis's handlers may have been wise to insist both boxers enter the ring overweight to forgo the risks of a title match, though each boxer had previously split two wins and two losses in their previous meetings.

=== Successful title defenses and boxing highlights, 1936–38 ===
In 1936, Lewis was nearly undefeated with a record of 18–1–1.

Facing "Tiger" Fox, leading contender for his World Light Heavyweight Title, at the Armory in Spokane, Washington on January 10, 1936, Lewis gained a third-round knockout in a non-title bout. Both boxers weighed in above the required Light Heavyweight limit. Carrying the fighting to Lewis in the first round, Fox dominated with an aggressive but unpolished style. In the second, the tide turned, and Lewis let loose with a dozen long-range rights that left Fox on his knees. In the middle of the third, Lewis uncorked three long-range rights that left Fox off balance, and then sent him to the mat with a powerful left hook to the chin that left him sprawling. His seconds had to carry him to his corner.

On March 6, 1936, Lewis defeated southpaw Eddie Simms in a thrilling ten-round points decision at Municipal Auditorium in St. Louis, Missouri. Though fifteen pounds lighter, Lewis carried five of the ten rounds in the bitter fight. Simms took four rounds, and gave Lewis one of the toughest battles of his life. As so often occurred, Lewis cut his left eye, and had a bruised nose and mouth to show for his night's work. In the close bout, Simms appeared to be the aggressor, which caused some in the crowd of 10,840 to dispute the final ruling, but Lewis waged an exceptional defense and scored with counter punches that were clean and decisive. Lewis used stiff left jabs to throw Simms off balance, and prevented him from using his deadly right. Simms took the first two rounds, but Lewis carried four of the last six. He shone in the tenth, with a dazzling display of punching in the final minute. Though exceedingly close, both judges and the referee scored for Lewis.

He retained the title on March 13, 1936, against Jock McAvoy in Madison Square Garden in a fifteen-round unanimous decision. Though Lewis dominated in all fifteen rounds, the majority of the crowd of 15,000, cheered for McAvoy, the game Englishman with the fast punch. McAvoy had the ability to duck quickly like many English boxers, but he took a heavy beating from Lewis, and mounted an effective defense in only the first five rounds. With a two-inch height and reach advantage, Lewis landed more punches and had no trouble with the crouch position of McAvoy, looping blows to his head with frequency. Round seven through ten clearly belonged to Lewis and greatly influenced the final decision.

Bob Godwin fell to Lewis at New York's Madison Square Garden in a technical knockout only 1:27 into the first round, on May 29, 1936. Before a tiny crowd of 2,988, Lewis batted Godwin to the mat with a stunning right cross, and after he rose unleashed a flurry of blows that forced the referee to call the fight.

Before a sizable crowd of 10,000, Lewis won a non-title ten-round decision against George Nichols, former Light Heavyweight Champion, at Municipal Auditorium in St. Louis, Missouri on August 12, 1936. Nichols staggered Lewis in the fifth with a crushing left, but Lewis piled up points in all the other rounds, and had Nichols hanging on groggily in the eighth and ninth.

Red Burman, a future World Heavyweight contender, became Lewis's knockout victim 2:20 in the second round, at Chicago Stadium on October 2, 1936. Shortly after the first round opening bell, Lewis dropped Burman for a nine-count with a right to the chin, and quickly scored three more knockdowns. The referee immediately attempted to call the fight, but Burman was saved by the first round closing bell. Burman was down for a two count within a minute of the second round bell. After being floored for a nine-count, Burman arose only to go down again, and the referee called the fight.

Lewis defeated British ring master, Londonite Len Harvey before an impressive audience of 11,800 in a decisive fifteen-round title decision at London's Wembley Stadium, on November 9, 1936. His attack caused Harvey to cling and clutch throughout the bout. From a slow start in the first two rounds, Lewis increased the fury of his attack using both fists in the remaining rounds, and trying hard for a knockout in the last three. Harvey was able to protect himself from a knockout in the final rounds. Lewis received few injuries, but slight damage to one of his eyes, which had been partially caused during his training for the bout. The injury later proved to be serious and catastrophic to his boxing career. Harvey complained of an injured right hand after the bout.

On February 8, 1937, Lewis defeated Al Ettore at Convention Hall in Philadelphia in a savage fifteen-round split decision before a crowd of 13,000. In round three, Ettore was down twice for nine counts from hard rights by Lewis. In a remarkable show of determination, he came back to take the fourth by a wide margin, staggering Lewis at one point, and waging battle all over the ring. One judge ruled for a draw, while the other judge and the referee ruled for Lewis. The Philadelphia Inquirer scored only six rounds for Ettore. The United Press gave eight rounds to Lewis, with seven for Ettore. Ettore dominated the first two rounds, doling out considerable punishment to Lewis, effectively using his eleven-pound weight advantage. He managed to win the ninth and tenth, but still was behind on points. Lewis suffered eye injuries in the eleventh round, as did Ettore. Several reporters attributed Lewis's dominance in rounds thirteen through fifteen, to Ettore's growing fatigue. Previously on January 4, 1937, Lewis had officially lost to Ettore at Convention Hall in a ten-round decision that was later changed to a very controversial draw by the Pennsylvania Boxing Commission. Ettore likely lost the first five rounds. In the final six rounds, Ettore seemed to dominate Lewis until the final bell. Lewis seemed to take the ninth and the tenth in the close bout according to one reporter, and in the scoring of Judge Al Levit. Most of the fans were rooting for a draw decision, which was not the official ruling.

Lewis won over heavyweight Willie Reddish at Griffith Stadium in Washington DC in a ten-round unanimous decision on June 29, 1937. In the eighth, ninth, and tenth, Lewis's right and left jabs to the head and a hard attack to the body wore out his opponent. After the fourth, Reddish won several rounds, when he became the aggressor, and gained the crowd's favor by appearing to take the lead throughout the bout. The crowd of 10,000 booed the decision. Lewis received damage to his eyes in the bout.

On December 17, 1937, Lewis defeated Johnny Risko before a crowd of 5,000 in a ten-round decision in Cleveland. Risko, fighting at 35, was nearing the end of a long boxing career. Lewis built a large margin in the early rounds, but appeared to coast in the end. The Associated Press gave him nine of the ten rounds, with one even.

Lewis was undefeated in twelve bouts in 1938. He won a title bout on April 25, with a fourth-round knockout against Emilio Martinez at the Auditorium in Minneapolis. Though a title match, the fight was not recognized as a World Light Heavyweight Title bout by the New York State Athletic Commission (NYSAC). Lewis took the offensive throughout the bout and received few blows from his opponent. His knockout blow was a straight right to the jaw of Martinez in the fourth, a punch he used once effectively in the first.

Elmer Ray was stopped by Lewis at Ponce de Leon Ball Park in Atlanta, Georgia in the twelfth round of a scheduled fifteen on May 19, 1938. Lewis, still reigning champion, floored Ray late in the eleventh with a punch to the kidneys, and finished him early in the twelfth. Ray, fighting with a fifteen-pound weight advantage, fought in a sideways crouch that baffled Lewis for a few rounds.

== Stripped of the NYSAC Light Heavyweight Championship, July 1938 ==
On July 28, 1938, the New York State Athletic Commission stripped Lewis of his title for failing to accept the challenge filed by "Tiger" Jack Fox.

Jimmy Adamick fell to Lewis in a ten-round split decision at Convention Hall in Philadelphia on September 15, 1938. Lewis started the first eight rounds with a commanding lead in points. In the ninth and tenth, he was at risk of losing by knockout to his heavyweight challenger, but weathered the challenge. Lewis outboxed, and outpunched his rival in the first seven rounds, but appeared to tire in the eighth. In the ninth, he was stunned by a crushing right that appeared to leave him unconscious on his feet, before he recovered and clinched. Adamick could not land the final blow before the bell ended the round, silencing the crowd of 15,000 rooting for a knockout. In the tenth, Lewis was quickly stunned by a solid left hook to the body and retreated, but used his experience and well-timed clinches to hang on. Dodging several of Adamick's best blows, Lewis gained confidence and lashed out with stiff rights to the face before the final bell ended the match. The judges gave six rounds to Lewis, and three or four to Adamick.

=== Final NBA World Light Heavyweight Title defense against Al Gainer, October 1938 ===
On October 28, 1938, he won a fifteen-round National Boxing Association (NBA) World Light Heavyweight title decision against Al Gainer in New Haven before a crowd of only 2,486, the smallest ever assembled for a title bout in any weight class. The fight was recognized as an NBA Light Heavyweight Title and was sanctioned by the state of Connecticut. Lewis claimed his refusal to fight Tiger Fox, the reason he was stripped of the NYSAC Light Heavyweight Title, was an economic necessity, as he knew Fox would not draw a significant audience. Lewis won decisively, but Gainer made a stronger showing in the first twelve rounds, visibly shaking Lewis with a few of his blows. Lewis took the decision, with a strong finish in the last three heats. The local Courant gave Lewis six rounds, Gainer four, with five even. Gainer's sluggishness in the last three rounds was the result of an illness he suffered the week before the fight. There were no knockdowns in the bout.

== Unsuccessful attempt at the World Heavyweight Championship, January 1939 ==
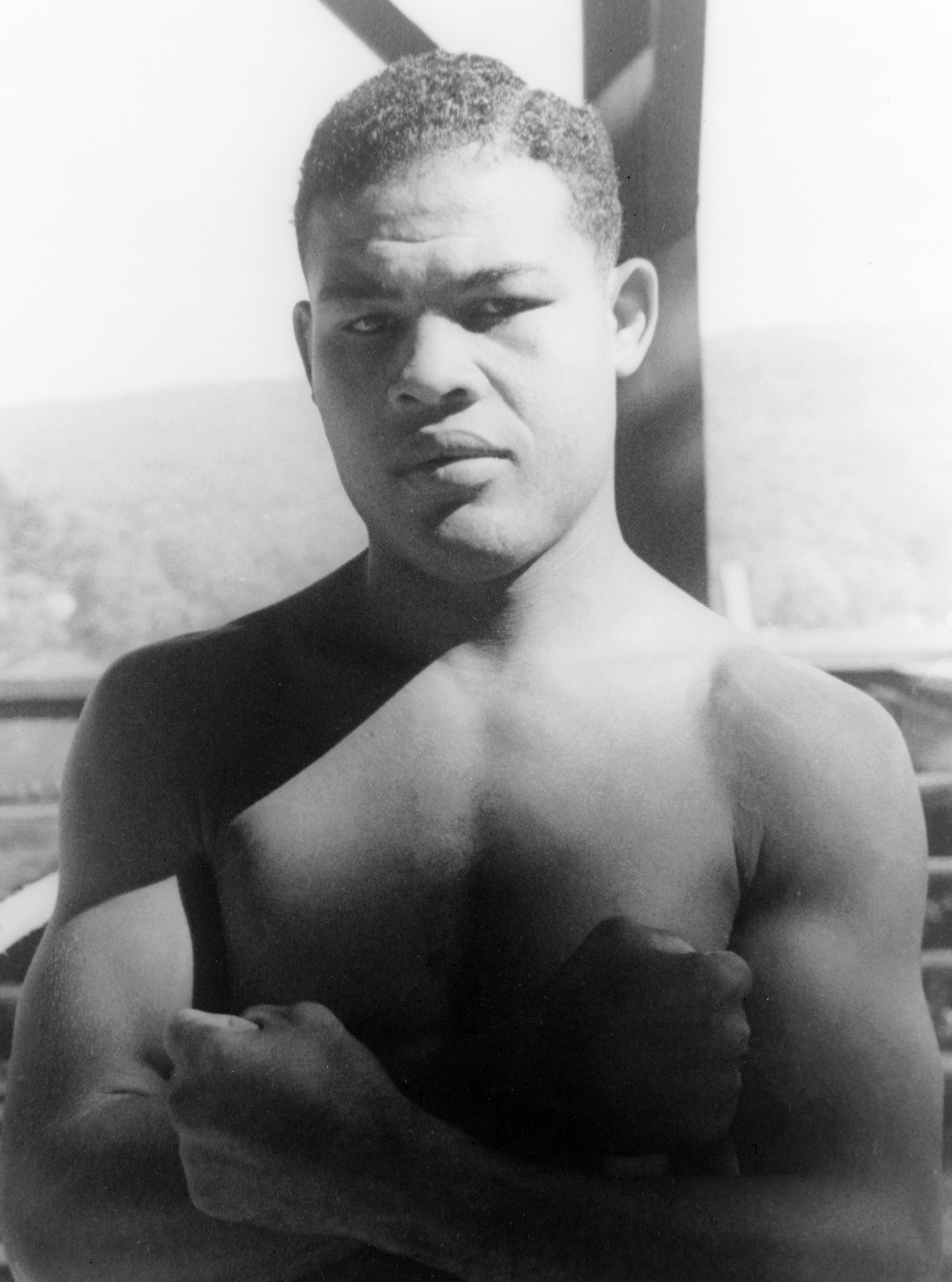
Joe Louis

On January 25, 1939, Lewis attempted to become the first Light Heavyweight champion in boxing history to go up in weight and conquer the World Heavyweight championship, but lost to reigning champion Joe Louis, in a knockout 2:29 into the first round in New York's Madison Square Garden. John Henry was down three times in less than three minutes from the lightning-fast blows of the reigning heavyweight champion. It was the only loss by knockout in Lewis's career, though his most memorable by many boxing fans.

== Boxing retirement ==
His next fight would have been a rematch with Len Harvey in London, but it was cancelled after Lewis failed the pre-fight medical tests. The blindness in his left eye and impaired vision in his right was of primary concern and he subsequently announced his retirement aged twenty-five years old. Lewis had a record of 103 wins, 9 losses and 6 draws, with 60 wins by knockout.

== Life after boxing ==
Though he had always abstained from alcohol, Lewis worked as a liquor salesman for a Baltimore company near the end of his career.

He had two brothers who boxed professionally; Christy and Paul. Christy was a club fighter, who often appeared in preliminary bouts before him. Paul was a Middleweight who fought feature bouts during the mid-1940s, primarily in Oakland. On an episode of the PBS show Finding Your Roots, DNA analysis proved that Christy Lewis was actor and musician LL Cool J's maternal grandfather who gave up his daughter for adoption.

Lewis died in Berkeley, California, in 1974 at the age of 59. He had suffered from emphysema and Parkinson's.

== Professional boxing record ==
117 fights	101 wins	11 losses
By knockout	57	1
By decision	44	9
By disqualification	0	1
Draws	5	

No.	Result	Record	Opponent	Type	Round	Date	Location	Notes
117	Loss	101–11–5	Joe Louis	KO	1 (15)	Jan 25, 1939	Madison Square Garden, New York City, New York, U.S.	For NYSAC, NBA, and The Ring heavyweight titles
116	Win	101–10–5	Al Gainer	UD	15	Oct 28, 1938	Arena, New Haven, Connecticut, U.S.	Retained NBA and The Ring light-heavyweight titles
115	Win	100–10–5	Jimmy Adamick	MD	10	Sep 15, 1938	Convention Hall, Philadelphia, Pennsylvania, U.S.	
114	Win	99–10–5	Domenico Ceccarelli	KO	3 (10)	Aug 25, 1938	Nutley Velodrome, Nutley, New Jersey, U.S.	
113	Win	98–10–5	Elmer Ray	KO	12 (15)	May 19, 1938	Ponce de Leon Ballpark, Atlanta, Georgia, U.S.	
112	Win	97–10–5	Domenico Ceccarelli	UD	10	May 5, 1938	5th Regiment Armory, Baltimore, Maryland, U.S.	
111	Win	96–10–5	Emilio Martinez	KO	4 (15)	Apr 25, 1938	Auditorium, Minneapolis, Minnesota, U.S.	Retained NYSAC, NBA and The Ring light-heavyweight titles
110	Win	95–10–5	Bob Tow	UD	10	Apr 4, 1938	Arena, Philadelphia, Pennsylvania, U.S.	
109	Win	94–10–5	Bud Mignault	PTS	10	Mar 25, 1938	Auditorium, Saint Paul, Minnesota, U.S.	
108	Win	93–10–5	Fred Lenhart	KO	3 (10)	Feb 11, 1938	Auditorium, Saint Paul, Minnesota, U.S.	
107	Win	92–10–5	Emil Scholz	PTS	10	Jan 31, 1938	Motor Square Garden, Pittsburgh, Pennsylvania, U.S.	
106	Win	91–10–5	Leroy Neblett	KO	3 (8)	Jan 20, 1938	Ellis Auditorium, Memphis, Tennessee, U.S.	
105	Win	90–10–5	Marty Gallagher	KO	3 (10)	Jan 18, 1938	Municipal Auditorium, Saint Louis, Missouri, U.S.	
104	Win	89–10–5	Leonard Neblett	TKO	8 (10)	Jan 10, 1938	Hippodrome Arena, Nashville, Tennessee, U.S.	
103	Win	88–10–5	Johnny Risko	PTS	10	Dec 17, 1937	Arena, Cleveland, Ohio, U.S.	
102	Win	87–10–5	Isidoro Gastanaga	TKO	9 (15)	Dec 7, 1937	Arena, Saint Louis, Missouri, U.S.	
101	Win	86–10–5	Salvatore Ruggirello	TKO	4 (10)	Nov 26, 1937	Auditorium, Minneapolis, Minnesota, U.S.	
100	Loss	85–10–5	Isidoro Gastanaga	UD	10	Oct 15, 1937	Olympia Stadium, Detroit, Michigan, U.S.	
99	Win	85–9–5	Italo Colonello	PTS	12	Aug 19, 1937	Forbes Field, Pittsburgh, Pennsylvania, U.S.	
98	Win	84–9–5	Willie Reddish	UD	10	Jun 28, 1937	Griffith Stadium, Washington, D.C., U.S.	
97	Win	83–9–5	Al Ettore	UD	15	Jun 15, 1937	Baker Bowl, Philadelphia, Pennsylvania, U.S.	
96	Win	82–9–5	Bob Olin	TKO	8 (15)	Jun 3, 1937	Arena, Saint Louis, Missouri, U.S.	Retained NYSAC, NBA, and The Ring light-heavyweight titles
95	Win	81–9–5	Jack Kranz	KO	3 (10)	May 21, 1937	Municipal Auditorium, Kansas City, Missouri, U.S.	
94	Win	80–9–5	Patsy Perroni	UD	10	May 14, 1937	Madison Square Garden, New York City, New York, U.S.	
93	Win	79–9–5	Emilio Martinez	PTS	10	May 4, 1937	Municipal Auditorium, Saint Louis, Missouri, U.S.	
92	Win	78–9–5	Pret Ferrar	KO	6 (10)	Apr 19, 1937	Coliseum, Des Moines, Iowa, U.S.	
91	Win	77–9–5	Harold Murphy	TKO	4 (10)	Apr 13, 1937	Ak-sar-ben Coliseum, Omaha, Nebraska, U.S.	
90	Win	76–9–5	Babe Davis	KO	3 (10)	Apr 9, 1937	Armory, Indianapolis, Indiana, U.S.	
89	Win	75–9–5	Don Barry	TKO	5 (10)	Apr 2, 1937	Municipal Auditorium, Saint Louis, Missouri, U.S.	
88	Win	74–9–5	Hans Birkie	UD	10	Mar 15, 1937	Arena, Philadelphia, Pennsylvania, U.S.	
87	Win	73–9–5	Al Ettore	MD	15	Feb 8, 1937	Convention Hall, Philadelphia, Pennsylvania, U.S.	
86	Win	72–9–5	Chester Palutis	TKO	7 (10)	Jan 28, 1937	Watres Armory, Scranton, Pennsylvania, U.S.	
85	Win	71–9–5	Art Sykes	KO	6 (10)	Jan 21, 1937	Duquesne Garden, Pittsburgh, Pennsylvania, U.S.	
84	Loss	70–9–5	Al Ettore	SD	10	Jan 4, 1937	Convention Hall, Philadelphia, Pennsylvania, U.S.	
83	Win	70–8–5	Len Harvey	PTS	15	Nov 9, 1936	Empire Pool, Wembley, London, England	Retained NYSAC, NBA, and The Ring light-heavyweight titles
82	Win	69–8–5	Red Burman	TKO	2 (10)	Oct 2, 1936	Chicago Stadium, Chicago, Illinois, U.S.	
81	Win	68–8–5	Tiger Hairston	KO	1 (10)	Sep 17, 1936	Kanawha Park, Charleston, West Virginia, U.S.	
80	Win	67–8–5	George Nichols	PTS	10	Aug 12, 1936	Municipal Auditorium, Saint Louis, Missouri, U.S.	
79	Win	66–8–5	Al Gainer	PTS	12	Jul 30, 1936	Forbes Field, Pittsburgh, Pennsylvania, U.S.	
78	Win	65–8–5	Max Marek	PTS	10	Jul 10, 1936	Comiskey Park, Chicago, Illinois, U.S.	
77	Win	64–8–5	James Merriott	KO	3 (10)	Jun 22, 1936	Peoria, Illinois, U.S.	
76	Win	63–8–5	Tony Shucco	TKO	8 (10)	Jun 17, 1936	Municipal Auditorium, Saint Louis, Missouri, U.S.	
75	Win	62–8–5	Dutch Weimer	TKO	5 (10)	Jun 12, 1936	Eagles Ball Park, York, Pennsylvania, U.S.	
74	Win	61–8–5	John Andersson	UD	10	Jun 8, 1936	Dexter Park Arena, Woodhaven, New York City, New York, U.S.	
73	Win	60–8–5	Bob Godwin	TKO	1 (10)	May 29, 1936	Madison Square Garden, New York City, New York, U.S.	
72	Win	59–8–5	Charley Massera	PTS	10	May 27, 1936	Greenlee Field, Pittsburgh, Pennsylvania, U.S.	
71	Win	58–8–5	Izzy Singer	UD	10	Apr 22, 1936	Chicago Arena, Chicago, Illinois, U.S.	
70	Draw	57–8–5	George Nichols	PTS	10	Apr 7, 1936	Broadway Auditorium, Buffalo, New York, U.S.	
69	Win	57–8–4	Jock McAvoy	UD	15	Mar 13, 1936	Madison Square Garden, New York City, New York, U.S.	Retained NYSAC, NBA, and The Ring light-heavyweight titles
68	Win	56–8–4	Eddie Simms	PTS	10	Mar 6, 1936	Municipal Auditorium, Saint Louis, Missouri, U.S.	
67	Win	55–8–4	Cyclone Lynch	KO	3 (10)	Jan 30, 1936	St. Mary's Auditorium, Walsenburg, Colorado, U.S.	
66	Loss	54–8–4	Emilio Martinez	PTS	10	Jan 29, 1936	City Auditorium, Denver, Colorado, U.S.	
65	Win	54–7–4	Al Stillman	TKO	4 (10)	Jan 17, 1936	Municipal Auditorium, Saint Louis, Missouri, U.S.	
64	Win	53–7–4	Tiger Jack Fox	KO	3 (10)	Jan 10, 1936	Armory, Spokane, Washington, U.S.	
63	Win	52–7–4	Dutch Weimer	PTS	10	Dec 20, 1935	Labor Temple, Tucson, Arizona, U.S.	
62	Win	51–7–4	Coleman Johns	KO	2 (10)	Dec 19, 1935	Madison Square Garden, Phoenix, Arizona, U.S.	
61	Win	50–7–4	George Simpson	TKO	2 (10)	Dec 11, 1935	Auditorium, Oakland, California, U.S.	
60	Loss	49–7–4	Maxie Rosenbloom	PTS	10	Nov 29, 1935	Dreamland Auditorium, San Francisco, California, U.S.	
59	Win	49–6–4	Bob Olin	UD	15	Oct 31, 1935	Arena, Saint Louis, Missouri, U.S.	Won NSYAC, NBA, and The Ring light-heavyweight titles
58	Loss	48–6–4	Abe Feldman	PTS	10	Jul 24, 1935	Coney Island Velodrome, New York City, New York, U.S.	
57	Loss	48–5–4	Maxie Rosenbloom	PTS	10	Jul 17, 1935	Auditorium, Oakland, California, U.S.	
56	Win	48–4–4	Lou Poster	TKO	5 (10)	Jul 8, 1935	Municipal Stadium, Cleveland, Ohio, U.S.	
55	Win	47–4–4	Izzy Singer	KO	1 (10)	Jun 24, 1935	Hinchliffe Stadium, Paterson, New Jersey, U.S.	
54	Win	46–4–4	Tom Patrick	KO	1 (10)	Jun 3, 1935	Hickey Park, Millvale, Pennsylvania, U.S.	
53	Win	45–4–4	Frank Rowsey	PTS	10	May 10, 1935	Dreamland Auditorium, San Francisco, California, U.S.	
52	Win	44–4–4	Bob Olin	PTS	10	Apr 12, 1935	Dreamland Auditorium, San Francisco, California, U.S.	
51	Win	43–4–4	Emilio Martinez	UD	10	Mar 13, 1935	City Auditorium, Denver, Colorado, U.S.	
50	Win	42–4–4	Terry Mitchell	TKO	6 (10)	Mar 4, 1935	Arena, Syracuse, New York, U.S.	
49	Win	41–4–4	Frank Wotanski	KO	3 (10)	Feb 25, 1935	Arena, Syracuse, New York, U.S.	
48	Win	40–4–4	Don Petrin	KO	7 (10)	Jan 29, 1935	Motor Square Garden, Pittsburgh, Pennsylvania, U.S.	
47	Win	39–4–4	Tony Shucco	UD	10	Dec 14, 1934	Madison Square Garden, New York City, New York, U.S.	
46	Win	38–4–4	Yale Okun	TKO	3 (10)	Nov 23, 1934	Madison Square Garden, New York City, New York, U.S.	
45	Loss	37–4–4	James J. Braddock	PTS	10	Nov 16, 1934	Madison Square Garden, New York City, New York, U.S.	
44	Win	37–3–4	Earl Wise	KO	3 (10)	Oct 31, 1934	Auditorium, Oakland, California, U.S.	
43	Win	36–3–4	Pietro Georgi	KO	3 (10)	Oct 17, 1934	Auditorium, Oakland, California, U.S.	
42	Draw	35–3–4	Don Barry	PTS	10	Oct 3, 1934	Civic Auditorium, San Francisco, California, U.S.	
41	Draw	35–3–3	Young Firpo	PTS	10	Sep 20, 1934	Multnomah Stadium, Portland, Oregon, U.S.	For Pacific Coast light-heavyweight title
40	Win	35–3–2	Norman Conrad	PTS	10	Sep 12, 1934	Civic Auditorium, San Francisco, California, U.S.	
39	Win	34–3–2	Tony Poloni	RTD	1 (15)	Sep 3, 1934	Dempsey Arena, Reno, Nevada, U.S.	
38	Win	33–3–2	Sandy Garrison Casanova	TKO	3 (10)	Apr 9, 1934	Fort Huachuca, Arizona, U.S.	
37	Win	32–3–2	Bobby Brown	KO	1 (10)	Feb 9, 1934	Broadway Arena, Tucson, Arizona, U.S.	
36	Win	31–3–2	Frank Rowsey	PTS	10	Oct 31, 1933	Olympic Auditorium, San Francisco, California, U.S.	
35	Win	30–3–2	Maxie Rosenbloom	PTS	10	Jul 31, 1933	Civic Auditorium, San Francisco, California, U.S.	
34	Win	29–3–2	Maxie Rosenbloom	PTS	10	Jul 10, 1933	Civic Auditorium, San Francisco, California, U.S.	
33	Draw	28–3–2	Fred Lenhart	PTS	10	Jun 16, 1933	Dreamland Auditorium, San Francisco, California, U.S.	
32	Win	28–3–1	Tom Patrick	PTS	10	May 15, 1933	Exposition Auditorium, San Francisco, California, U.S.	
31	Win	27–3–1	Emmett Rocco	TKO	7 (10)	Apr 7, 1933	Dreamland Auditorium, San Francisco, California, U.S.	
30	Win	26–3–1	Tuffy Dial	KO	4 (10)	Dec 9, 1932	Madison Square Garden, Phoenix, Arizona, U.S.	
29	Loss	25–3–1	Maxie Rosenbloom	PTS	10	Nov 16, 1932	Civic Auditorium, San Francisco, California, U.S.	
28	Win	25–2–1	Lou Scozza	UD	10	Oct 26, 1932	Civic Auditorium, San Francisco, California, U.S.	
27	Win	24–2–1	Fred Lenhart	TKO	4 (10)	Oct 5, 1932	Civic Auditorium, San Francisco, California, U.S.	
26	Win	23–2–1	James J. Braddock	PTS	10	Sep 21, 1932	Civic Auditorium, San Francisco, California, U.S.	
25	Win	22–2–1	Jimmy Hanna	TKO	6 (10)	Jul 29, 1932	Dreamland Auditorium, San Francisco, California, U.S.	
24	Win	21–2–1	Pietro Georgi	KO	1 (10)	Jul 13, 1932	Dreamland Auditorium, San Francisco, California, U.S.	
23	Win	20–2–1	Yale Okun	PTS	10	Apr 22, 1932	Dreamland Auditorium, San Francisco, California, U.S.	
22	Win	19–2–1	Sammy Bass	TKO	1 (4)	Mar 23, 1932	Auditorium, Oakland, California, U.S.	
21	Win	18–2–1	Schoolboy	KO	3 (6)	Nov 27, 1931	State Fair Grounds, Phoenix, Arizona, U.S.	
20	Win	17–2–1	Kid Valdon	TKO	3 (10)	Oct 9, 1931	Enterprise Park, Prescott, Arizona, U.S.	
19	Win	16–2–1	Joe Arciniega	KO	5 (8)	Sep 14, 1931	Phoenix, Arizona, U.S.	
18	Win	15–2–1	Roy Guinn	KO	4 (10)	Jul 13, 1931	Prescott A.C. Arena, Prescott, Arizona, U.S.	Retained USA Arizona State middleweight title
17	Win	14–2–1	Lloyd Phelps	PTS	8	Jul 1, 1931	Mesa, Arizona, U.S.	Won vacant USA Arizona State middleweight title
16	Win	13–2–1	Herb Coleman	PTS	4	Jun 25, 1931	Pasadena Arena, Pasadena, Arizona, U.S.	
15	Win	12–2–1	Soldier Hicks	PTS	6	Jun 10, 1931	Labor Temple, Tucson, Arizona, U.S.	
14	Win	11–2–1	Evans Fortune	KO	3 (6)	May 29, 1931	Phoenix, Arizona, U.S.	
13	Win	10–2–1	Tony Cadena	KO	1 (6)	May 15, 1931	Phoenix, Arizona, U.S.	
12	Win	9–2–1	Sam Terrin	KO	3 (10)	Mar 11, 1931	O.K. Hall, Prescott, Arizona, U.S.	Terrin died of injuries sustained in the fight
11	Win	8–2–1	Bobby Richardson	KO	2 (?)	Feb 6, 1931	Phoenix, Arizona, U.S.	
10	Win	7–2–1	Palmleaf Wright	KO	2 (?)	Jan 30, 1931	Phoenix, Arizona, U.S.	
9	Win	6–2–1	Roy Guinn	PTS	10	Jan 2, 1931	Phoenix, Arizona, U.S.	
8	Win	5–2–1	Tall Johnson	KO	1 (6)	Oct 30, 1930	O.K. Hall, Prescott, Arizona, U.S.	
7	Loss	4–2–1	Palmleaf Wright	DQ	2 (6)	Oct 23, 1930	O.K. Hall, Prescott, Arizona, U.S.	
6	Win	4–1–1	Leo Davis	KO	1 (4)	Oct 16, 1930	O.K. Hall, Prescott, Arizona, U.S.	
5	Draw	3–1–1	Dynamite Hunter	PTS	6	Jan 17, 1930	Madison Square Garden, Phoenix, Arizona, U.S.	
4	Win	3–1	Battling MacGregor	PTS	4	Jan 3, 1930	Madison Square Garden, Phoenix, Arizona, U.S.	
3	Win	2–1	Young Tiger Flowers	PTS	4	Nov 22, 1929	Madison Square Garden, Phoenix, Arizona, U.S.	
2	Win	1–1	Jake Henderson	PTS	4	Apr 17, 1929	Arcadia Hall, Phoenix, Arizona, U.S.	
1	Loss	0–1	Buster Grant	PTS	4	Jan 18, 1929	Arcadia Hall, Phoenix, Arizona, U.S.	

== Titles in boxing ==
=== Major world titles ===
- NYSAC light heavyweight champion (175 lbs)
- NBA (WBA) light heavyweight champion (175 lbs)

=== The Ring magazine titles ===
- The Ring light heavyweight champion (175 lbs)

=== Regional/International titles ===
- Arizona State middleweight champion (160 lbs)

=== Undisputed titles ===
- Undisputed light heavyweight champion

== Primary boxing achievements ==
Achievements
Preceded by Bob Olin	NYSAC light heavyweight champion October 31, 1935 – July 27, 1938; Stripped	Vacant Title next held by Melio Bettina
Preceded by Bob Olin	NBA light heavyweight champion October 31, 1935 – June 1939; Stripped & Retired	Vacant Title next held by Billy Conn
Preceded by Bob Olin	The Ring light heavyweight champion October 31, 1935 – June 1939; Retired	Vacant Title next held by Billy Conn

Lewis was inducted into the International Boxing Hall of Fame in 1994.

== Film depictions ==
Lewis is portrayed by Troy Amos-Ross in the 2005 Braddock biopic film Cinderella Man.

== See also ==
- List of light heavyweight boxing champions
