= George Mulholland (boxer) =

American boxer

George Edmond Mulholland (May 10, 1904 – April 2, 1971) was an American boxer who competed in the 1924 Summer Olympics. He was born and died Indianapolis, Indiana. In 1924 he was eliminated in the quarter-finals of the light heavyweight class after losing his fight to the upcoming silver medalist Thyge Petersen.
