= Firpo =

Firpo may refer to:

== Surname ==
- Luis Ángel Firpo, Argentine boxer
- Junior Firpo
- Kaz Firpo, American screenwriter
- Roberto Firpo, Argentine tango pianist, composer and bandleader

== Nickname ==
- Firpo Marberry, baseball player
- Pampero Firpo, ring name of Argentine-American wrestler Juan Kachmanian
- Young Firpo, American boxer in the US northwest in the 1920s and 1930s

== See also ==
- C.D. Luis Ángel Firpo, a Salvadoran association football club
