= Petraitis =

Petraitis is the masculine form of a patronymic Lithuanian family name. Its feminine forms are: Petraitienė (married to or widow of Petraitis) and Petraitytė (unmarried woman, daughter of Petraitis).

Notable people with the surname include:

- Julius Petraitis (born 1905, date of death unknown), Lithuanian long-distance runner
- Vikki Petraitis, Australian true crime author
