= Courtis =

Courtis is a surname. Notable people with the surname include:

- Anla Courtis (born 1972), Argentine musician, artist, composer, and sound artist
- Christopher Courtis (born 1994), Barbadian swimmer
- John Courtis (1902–1975), British boxer

== See also ==
- Curtis
