= Saraudi =

Saraudi is an Italian surname. Notable people with the surname include:

- Carlo Saraudi (1899–1973), Italian boxer
- Giulio Saraudi (1938–2005), Italian boxer, son of Carlo
