= Emil Johansson =

Emil Johansson may refer to:

- Emil Johansson (footballer) (born 1986), Swedish footballer
- Emil Johansson (tug of war) (1885–1972), Swedish tug of war competitor
- Emil Johansson (boxer) (1907–1986), Swedish boxer
- Emil Johansson (ice hockey) (born 1996), Swedish ice hockey player
- Emil Johansson (cyclist), Swedish freeride mountain biker
- Emil Johansson (sprinter) (born 2002), Swedish runner
