= England Boxing National Amateur Championships Light-Heavyweight Champions =

English Boxing competition

England Boxing National Amateur Championships Light-Heavyweight Champions (U80kg)
- Status: active
- Genre: Boxing
- Inaugurated: 1920
- Organiser: England Boxing

The England Boxing National Amateur Championships Light-Heavyweight Championship formerly known as the ABA Championships is the primary English amateur boxing championship. It had previously been contested by all the nations of the United Kingdom.

== History ==
The light-heavyweight division was inaugurated in 1920 and is currently contested in the under-80 Kg weight division. The championships are highly regarded in the boxing world and seen as the most prestigious national amateur championships.

== Past winners ==
Year	Winner	Club
1920	Harold Franks	St. Pancras ABC
1921	Len E. Collett	Surrey Commercial Docks ABC
1922	Harry Mitchell	Polytechnic ABC
1923	Harry Mitchell	Polytechnic ABC
1924	Harry Mitchell	Polytechnic ABC
1925	Harry Mitchell	Polytechnic ABC
1926	Don McCorkindale	South Africa
1927	Alf Jackson	St. Pancras ABC
1928	Alf Jackson	St. Pancras ABC
1929	Joe Goyder	Old Goldsmiths ABC
1930	John Boy Murphy	Irish BC
1931	Jack Petersen	Gabalfa BC
1932	Joe Goyder	City Police & Goldsmiths ABC
1933	George Brennan	Nottingham Police ABC
1934	George Brennan	Nottingham Police ABC
1935	Richard Hearns	Dublin Civic Guards BC
1936	Jimmy Magill	Royal Ulster Constabulary BC
1937	Cpl. Joseph Wilby	Royal Air Force
1938	Alf Brown	Catford & District ABC
1939	Bruce Woodcock	Doncaster LNER ABC
1940–1942	not held	
1943	Mark Hart	Fitzroy Lodge & Lynn ABC
1944	SMI Ernie Shackleton	Transport Regiment
1945	Alex Watson	Nottingham City Police & APTC ABC
1946	SMI Johnny E. Taylor	Army
1947	Alex Watson	Leith Victoria ABC
1948	Cpl. Don Scott	Army
1949	Peter Messervy	Royal Navy
1950	Peter Messervy	Royal Navy
1951	George Walker	Thomas Refinery ABC
1952	Henry Cooper	Eltham & District ABC
1953	Pte. Henry Cooper	Army
1954	Tony Madigan	Fulham ABC
1955	Dave Rent	Maple Leaf ABC
1956	Dave Mooney	Lanark Welfare BC
1957	Tom Green	Hull Boys ABC
1958	L/Bdr Joe Leeming	Army
1959	Johnny Ould	Fisher ABC
1960	Johnny Ould	Fisher ABC
1961	Jack Bodell	Loughborough & District ABC
1962	Johnny Hendrickson	Battersea ABC
1963	Brian Murphy	Chorley Boys Club
1964	John Fisher	Fauldhouse Miners' Welfare ABC
1965	Eric Whistler	Hampstead ABC
1966	Roger Tighe	Hull Boys ABC
1967	Maxie Smith	Royal Navy
1968	Ray Brittle	Fitzroy Lodge ABC
1969	Johnny Frankham	Reading ABC
1970	John Rafferty	Clarkston ABC
1971	John Conteh	Kirkby ABC
1972	Billy Knight	Lynn ABC
1973	Billy Knight	Lynn ABC
1974	Billy Knight	Lynn ABC
1975	Malcolm Heath	Hull Fish Trades ABC
1976	Greg Evans	Salisbury ABC
1977	Chris Lawson	Pembroke ABC
1978	Vince Smith	Kyrle Hall ABC
1979	Andy Straughn	Hitchen Youth ABC
1980	Andy Straughn	Hitchen Youth ABC
1981	Andy Straughn	Hitchen Youth ABC
1982	Glen Crawford	Market District ABC
1983	Tony Wilson	Wolverhampton ABC
1984	Tony Wilson	Wolverhampton ABC
1985	John Beckles	Islington ABC
1986	Jim Moran	Austin ABC
1987	John Beckles	Fairburn House ABC
1988	Harold Lawson	St. Francis ABC
1989	Nicky Piper	Penarth ABC
1990	Joseph McCluskey	Croy Miners ABC
1991	Anthony Todd	Darlington ABC
1992	Kelly Oliver	Bracebridge ABC
1993	Kelly Oliver	Bracebridge ABC
1994	Kelly Oliver	Bracebridge ABC
1995	Kelly Oliver	Bracebridge ABC
1996	Courtney Fry	Islington Boys ABC
1997	Paul Rogers	Penhill RBL ABC
1998	Courtney Fry	Repton ABC
1999	Joe Ainscough	Kirkdale ABC
2000	Peter Haymer	St. Pancras ABC
2001	Courtney Fry	Salisbury ABC
2002	Anthony Marsden	Birtley ABC
2003	James Boyd	Donnington Ex Servicemen's ABC
2004	Murtala Abdulsalan	St. Pancras Kronk ABC
2005	David Pendleton	Birtley ABC
2006	Tony Jeffries	Sunderland ABC
2007	Obed Mbwakongo	Fisher ABC
2008	Istvan Szucs	All Stars ABC
2009	Obed Mbwakongo	Lynn AC
2010	Lawrence Osueke	Newcastle College
2011	Sam Pomphrey	Broadplain ABC
2012	Kirk Garvey	Earlsfield ABC
2013	Ricky Crotty	Hoddesdon ABC
2014	Joshua Buatsi	South Norwood & Victory ABC
2015	Joshua Buatsi	South Norwood & Victory ABC
2016	Tom Whittaker-Hart	Rotunda ABC
2017	George Crotty	Royal Navy
2018	Ben Rees	Birtley ABC
2019	Aaron Bowen	Triumph ABC
2020	cancelled due to COVID 19.	
2021	Aaron Bowen	Box Smart Elite
2022	Isaac Okoh	Chadwell St Mary
2023	Oladimeji Shittu	Fire Star
2024	Kyle Shaw-Tullin	Royal Navy
2025	Bobby Wallace	Belvedere
2026	Cameron Lewis	RAF
