= Michael Maurer =

Michael Maurer may refer to:

- Maven Maurer, Canadian football fullback (formerly known as Mike Maurer)
- Michel Maurer aka Michael Maurer (1904–1983), Luxembourgian boxer
