= Akelaitis =

Akelaitis is a Lithuanian surname. Notable people with the surname include:

- Adolfas Akelaitis (1910–2007), Lithuanian high jumper
- Mikalojus Akelaitis (1829–1887), Lithuanian writer, publicist, and amateur linguist
