= Vladas Jankauskas =

Vladas Jankauskas may refer to:

- Vladas Jankauskas (painter) (1923–83), Lithuanian painter
- Vladas Jankauskas (cyclist) (1903–69), Lithuanian cyclist
