= Karel Miljon =

Dutch boxer

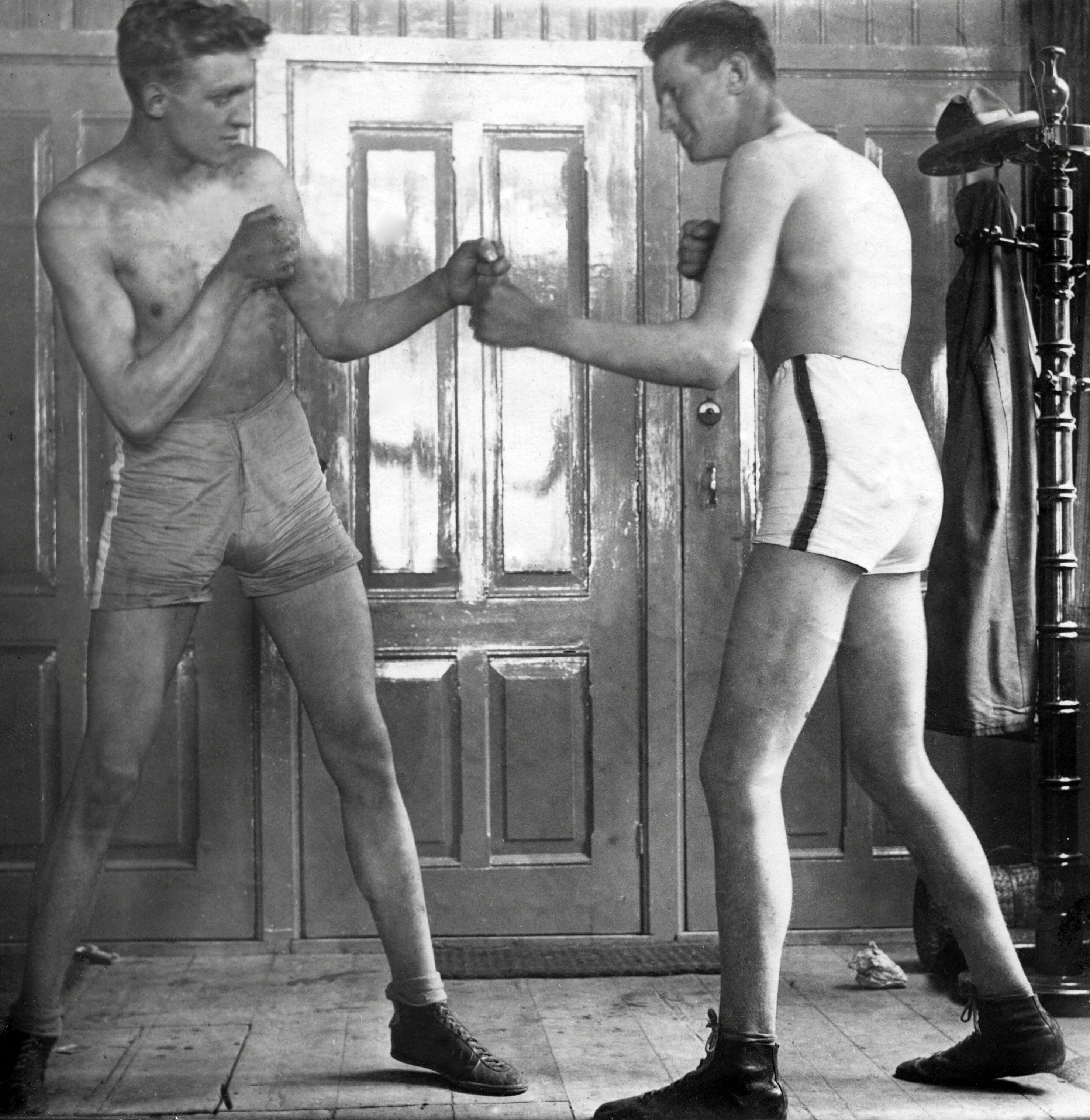
- Karel Miljon (left) in 1924

Medal record

Men's boxing

Representing the Netherlands

Olympic Games
Bronze medal – third place	1928 Amsterdam	Light heavyweight

European Amateur Championships
Silver medal – second place	1927 Berlin	Light heavyweight
Bronze medal – third place	1925 Stockholm	Light heavyweight

Karel Leendert Miljon (17 September 1903, Amsterdam – 8 February 1984, Bennebroek) was a Dutch boxer, who won the bronze medal in the light heavyweight division at the 1928 Summer Olympics in Amsterdam.

Miljon won the Dutch title eleven times, and also participated in the 1924 Summer Olympics in Paris, where he was eliminated in the first round of the light heavyweight competition after losing his fight against the upcoming gold medalist Harry Mitchell.

== 1928 Olympic results ==
Below is the record of Karel Miljon, a Dutch light heavyweight boxer who competed at the 1928 Amsterdam Olympics:

- Round of 16: Defeated Emil Johansson (Sweden) on points
- Quarterfinal: Defeated Alfred Jackson (Great Britain) on points
- Semifinal: Lost to Ernst Pistulla (Germany) on points
- Bronze Medal Bout: Defeated Don McCorkindale (South Africa) on points (was awarded bronze medal)
