= Boxing at the 1928 Summer Olympics – Light heavyweight =

Boxing competitions

Men's light heavyweight boxing at the Games of the IX Olympiad
- Venue: Krachtsportgebouw
- Date: August 8–11, 1928
- Competitors: 16 from 16 nations

Medalists
1st place, gold medalist(s)		Víctor Avendaño	Argentina
2nd place, silver medalist(s)		Ernst Pistulla	Germany
3rd place, bronze medalist(s)		Karel Miljon	Netherlands

The men's light heavyweight event was part of the boxing programme at the 1928 Summer Olympics. The weight class was the second-heaviest contested, and allowed boxers of up to 175 pounds (79.4 kilograms). The competition was held from Wednesday, August 8, 1928, to Saturday, August 11, 1928.

== Results ==
Round of 16; August 8
Don McCorkindale (RSA)	PTS
Domenico Ceccarelli (ITA)	L
Juozas Vinča (LTU)	PTS
Robert Fouquet (FRA)	L
Víctor Avendaño (ARG)	PTS
Sergio Ojeda (CHI)	L
Donald Carrick (CAN)	PTS
Jean Welter (LUX)	L
Ernst Pistulla (GER)	PTS
Leon Lucas (USA)	L
William Murphy (IRL)	W
José Montllor (ESP)	KO1
Karel Miljon (NED)	PTS
Emil Johansson (SWE)	L
Alf Jackson (GBR)	PTS
Alf Cleverley (NZL)	L

Quarterfinals; August 9
McCorkindale (RSA)	W
Vinča (LTU)	KO2
Avendaño (ARG)	PTS
Carrick (CAN)	L
Pistulla (GER)	PTS
Murphy (IRL)	L
Miljon (NED)	PTS
Jackson (GBR)	L

Semifinals; August 10
McCorkindale (RSA)	L
Avendaño (ARG)	PTS
Pistulla (GER)	PTS
Miljon (NED)	L

Final; August 11
Avendaño (ARG)	PTS
Pistulla (GER)	L
Bronze medal bout
Miljon (NED)	PTS
McCorkindale (RSA)	L
