= Víctor Avendaño =

Argentine boxer

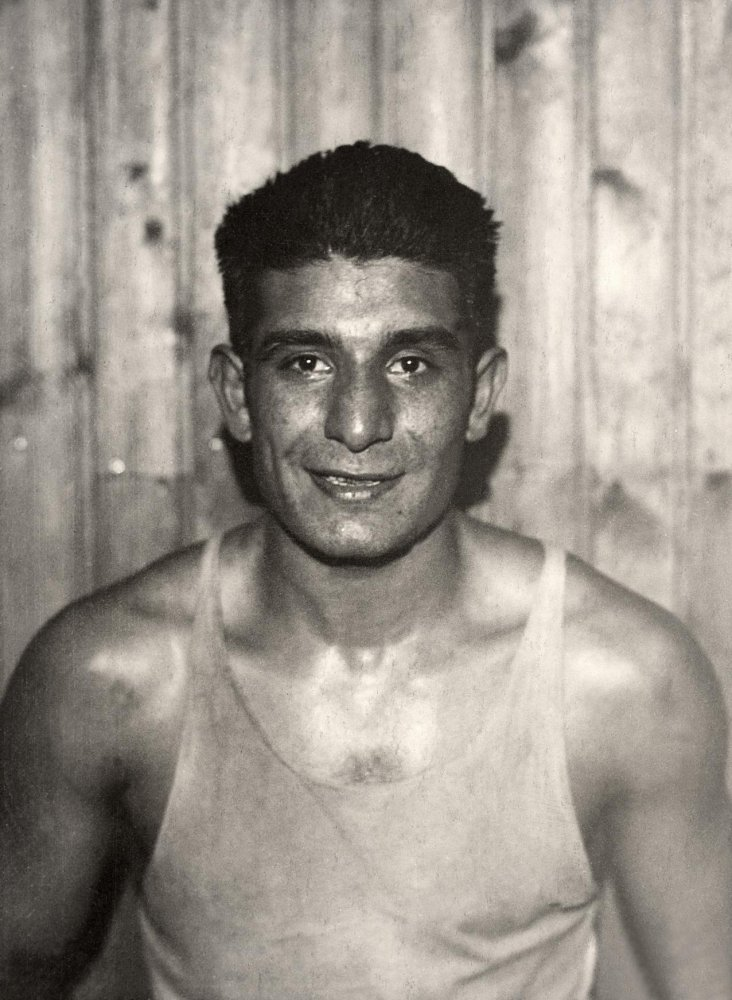

Medal record

Men's Boxing
Gold medal – first place	1928 Amsterdam	Light heavyweight

Víctor Ángel Pedro Avendaño (June 5, 1907, in Buenos Aires – July 1, 1984) was an Argentine boxer who competed in the 1928 Summer Olympics.

In 1928 he won the gold medal in the light heavyweight class after winning the final against Ernst Pistulla.

== 1928 Olympic results ==
Below is the record of Victor Avendano, an Argentine light heavyweight boxer who competed at the 1928 Amsterdam Olympics:

- Round of 16: Defeated Sergio Ojeda (Chile) on points
- Quarterfinal: Defeated Donald Carrick (Canada) on points
- Semifinal: Defeated Donald McCorkindale (South Africa) on points
- Final: Defeated Ernst Pistulla (Germany) on points (won gold medal)
