= Sergio Ojeda =

Sergio Ojeda may refer to:

- Sergio Ojeda Dóren (1906–1996), Chilean politician and boxer
- Sergio Ojeda (footballer) (born 1992), Argentine footballer
- Sergio Ojeda Uribe (1943–2026), Chilean politician
