= Amedeo Grillo =

Italian boxer

Amedeo Grillo (5 June 1901 – 13 July 1979) was an Italian boxer who competed in the 1924 Summer Olympics. He was born in La Spezia. In 1924, he was eliminated in the second round of the light heavyweight class after losing his fight to Georges Rossignon.
