= Jean Welter =

Luxembourgish boxer (1901–1977)

Jean Welter (2 May 1901 in Esch-sur-Alzette – 23 March 1977) was a Luxembourgish boxer who competed in the 1924 Summer Olympics and in the 1928 Summer Olympics. In 1924 he was eliminated in the second round of the light heavyweight class after losing his fight to Tom Kirby of the United States. Four years later he was eliminated in the first round of the light heavyweight division when he lost his fight to Donald Carrick of Canada. He was the father of Jean Welter, Jr. who competed in the 1948 Summer Olympics and in the 1952 Summer Olympics also as a boxer.

== 1928 Olympic record ==
Below are the results of Jean Welter, a light heavyweight boxer from Luxembourg, who competed at the 1928 Amsterdam Olympics:

- Round of 16: lost to Donald Carrick (Canada) by decision
