= Robert Fouquet =

French boxer

Robert Fouquet (25 January 1905 – 7 August 1949) was a French boxer who competed in the 1924 Summer Olympics and in the 1928 Summer Olympics. In 1924 he was eliminated in the second round of the light heavyweight class after losing his fight to the upcoming gold medalist Harry Mitchell. Four years later he was eliminated in the first round of the light heavyweight class after losing his fight to Juozas Vinča.
