= Luis Correa (boxer) =

Chilean boxer

Luis Correa Maurelios (25 August 1897 – 14 August 1949) was a Chilean boxer who competed in the 1924 Summer Olympics. In 1924 he was eliminated in the first round of the light heavyweight class after losing his fight to Georges Rossignon.
