= Jan Gerbich =

Polish boxer

Jan Gerbich (13 December 1900 – 30 August 1994) was a Polish boxer who competed in the 1924 Summer Olympics. In 1924 he was eliminated in the second round of the light heavyweight class after losing his bout to the eventual silver medalist Thyge Petersen of Denmark.
