= Kelly Oliver (boxer) =

English boxer (born 1973)

Personal information
- Nationality: England
- Born: 11 November 1973 (age 52) Lincoln, Lincolnshire

Kelly Oliver (born 1973) is a male retired boxer who competed for England.

== Boxing career ==
Oliver was four times National Champion in 1992, 1993, 1994 and 1995 after winning the prestigious ABA light-heavyweight title, boxing out of the Bracebridge ABC.

He represented England in the light-heavyweight (-81 kg) division, at the 1994 Commonwealth Games in Victoria, British Columbia, Canada.

He turned professional on 20 January 1996 and fought in 23 fights until 2008.
