= Michel Maurer =

Luxembourgish boxer

Michel Maurer (12 October 1904 – 23 November 1983) was a Luxembourgish boxer who competed in the 1924 Summer Olympics. In 1924 he was eliminated in the second round of the light heavyweight class after losing his fight to John Courtis of Great Britain.
