= Johnny Frankham =

English boxer

Personal information
- Nationality: British (English)
- Born: 6 June 1948 Reading, Berkshire

Sport
- Sport: boxing

Johnny Frankham (born 6 June 1948) is an English former professional boxer who was the British light-heavyweight champion in 1975. Frankham is an English Romany Gypsy.

Frankham won the Amateur Boxing Association 1969 light heavyweight title, when boxing out of the Reading ABC.

In 2010, Frankham was jailed for two years at Guildford Crown Court for rogue trading.

== Exhibition boxing record ==
1 fight	0 wins	0 losses
Non-scored	1	

No.	Result	Record	Opponent	Type	Round, time	Date	Location	Notes
1	—N/a	0–0 (1)	(United States) Muhammad Ali	—N/a	2	19 Oct 1971	(United Kingdom) Royal Albert Hall, London, England	Non-scored bout
