= Ernst Pistulla =

German boxer

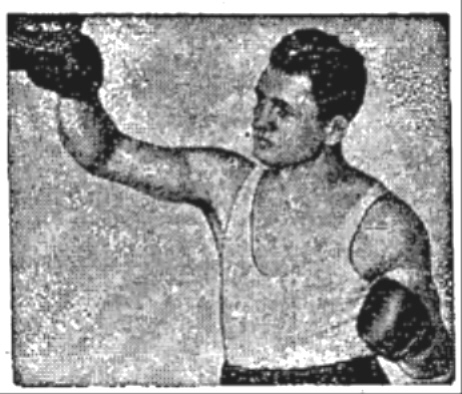
- Ernst Pistulla

Medal record

Men's Boxing

Olympic Games
Silver medal – second place	1928 Amsterdam	Light heavyweight

Ernst Pistulla (28 November 1906 – 3 March 1945) was a German boxer who competed in the 1928 Summer Olympics. He was born in Goslar. Pistulla was the German amateur light heavyweight champion in 1928. He won the silver medal in the light heavyweight class after losing the final against Víctor Avendaño. He died in a Nazi prison during World War II, supposedly of neurosyphilis.

== 1928 Olympic results ==
- Round of 16: Defeated Leon Lucas (United States) on points
- Quarterfinal: Defeated William Murphy (Ireland) on points
- Semifinal: Defeated Karel Miljon (Netherlands) on points
- Final: Lost to Victorio Avendano (Argentina) on points (was awarded silver medal)
