= Joe Leeming (boxer) =

Former boxer who competed for England

Personal information
- Nationality: British (English)
- Born: 2 June 1936

Sport
- Sport: Boxing
- Event: Light heavyweight
- Club: Army BC

Joe Leeming (born 1936), is a male former boxer who competed for England.

== Biography ==
Leeming represented the England team during the boxing tournament at the 1958 British Empire and Commonwealth Games in the -81 kg division.

He trained at Rugby Corinthians Boxing Club and won the Amateur Boxing Association 1958 light heavyweight title.

He made his professional debut on 7 July 1962 and fought in 11 fights until 1963.
