= Leon Lucas =

American boxer

Leonard "Leon" Lucas (September 4, 1901 – May 19, 1971) was an American boxer who competed in the 1928 Summer Olympics. He was born and died in Camden, New Jersey. In 1928 he was eliminated in the first round of the light heavyweight class after losing his fight to the upcoming silver medalist Ernst Pistulla.

== 1928 Olympic boxing ==
Below is the record of Leon Lucas, an American light heavyweight boxer who competed at the 1928 Amsterdam Olympics:

- Round of 16: lost to Ernst Pistulla (Germany) by decision
