= José Montllor =

Spanish boxer

Personal information
- Nationality: Spanish
- Born: 11 November 1907; Alcoy, Spain

Sport
- Sport: Boxing

José Montllor (born 11 November 1907, date of death unknown) was a Spanish boxer. He competed in the men's light heavyweight event at the 1928 Summer Olympics.
