= Johnny Ould =

British boxer (1940–2014)

Personal information
- Nationality: British
- Born: 19 May 1940; London, England
- Died: 2 June 2014 (aged 74); Catford, London, England

Sport
- Sport: Boxing

John Christopher Ould (19 May 1940 – 2 June 2014) was a British boxer. He fought as Johnny Ould. He competed in the men's light heavyweight event at the 1960 Summer Olympics. In his first fight, he lost to Petar Spasov of Bulgaria by decision in the Round of 32.

Ould won the Amateur Boxing Association 1959 and 1960 light heavyweight title, when boxing out of the Fisher ABC.

Ould died in Catford on 2 June 2014, at the age of 74.
