= Joe Goyder =

English boxer (1907–1986)

Personal information
- Nationality: British (English)
- Born: 1 July 1907 London, England
- Died: 12 February 1986 (aged 78) London, England

Sport
- Sport: boxing
Medal record
Men's Boxing
Representing England
British Empire Games
Gold medal – first place	1930 Hamilton	Light heavyweight

Joseph William Goyder (1 July 1907 – 12 February 1986) was an English boxer who competed for Great Britain in the 1928 Summer Olympics. He was born and died in London. He fought as Joe Goyder.

At the 1928 Summer Olympics, he was eliminated in the first round of the heavyweight class after losing his bout to Sam Olij. Two years later at the 1930 Empire Games, he won the gold medal in the light heavyweight class after winning the final against Al Pitcher of Canada.

Goyder won the Amateur Boxing Association 1929 and 1932 light heavyweight title, when boxing out of the Old Goldsmiths ABC and City Police respectively.
