= John Kidley =

Irish boxer

Personal information
- Nationality: Irish
- Born: 13 February 1898
- Died: April 1985

Sport
- Sport: Boxing

John Kidley (13 February 1898 – April 1985) was an Irish boxer. He competed in the men's light heavyweight event at the 1924 Summer Olympics.
