= Boxing at the 1924 Summer Olympics – Light heavyweight =

Light heavyweight boxing at the Games of the VIII Olympiad
- Venue: Vélodrome d'hiver
- Dates: July 16–20, 1924
- Competitors: 20 from 14 nations

Medalists
| 1st place, gold medalist(s) | | Harry Mitchell; Great Britain |
| 2nd place, silver medalist(s) | | Thyge Petersen; Denmark |
| 3rd place, bronze medalist(s) | | Sverre Sørsdal; Norway |

The men's light heavyweight event was part of the boxing programme at the 1924 Summer Olympics. The weight class was the second-heaviest contested, and allowed boxers of up to 175 pounds (79.4 kilograms). The competition was held from Wednesday, July 16, 1924, to Sunday, July 20, 1924. 20 boxers from 14 nations competed.

== Results ==
Round of 32; July 16
Harry Mitchell (GBR) | W
Karel Miljon (NED) | DIS3
Georges Rossignon (FRA) | PTS
Luis Correa (CHI) | L
Sverre Sørsdal (NOR) | PTS
Fernand Delarge (BEL) | L
Thyge Petersen (DEN) | PTS
Arturo Rodríguez (ARG) | L

Round of 16; July 17
Robert Fouquet (FRA) | L
Harry Mitchell (GBR) | PTS
Georges Rossignon (FRA) | PTS
Amedeo Grillo (ITA) | L
Carlo Saraudi (ITA) | PTS
Carl Lindberg (DEN) | L
John Courtis (GBR) | RSC3
Michel Maurer (LUX) | L
Tom Kirby (USA) | PTS
Jean Welter (LUX) | L
John Kidley (IRL) | L
Sverre Sørsdal (NOR) | RSC1
Thyge Petersen (DEN) | RSC2
Jan Gerbich (POL) | L
George Mulholland (USA) | PTS
Charley Belanger (CAN) | L

Quarterfinals; July 18
Harry Mitchell (GBR) | RSC1
Georges Rossignon (FRA) | L
Carlo Saraudi (ITA) | PTS
John Courtis (GBR) | L
Tom Kirby (USA) | L
Sverre Sørsdal (NOR) | PTS
Thyge Petersen (DEN) | PTS
George Mulholland (USA) | L

Semifinals; July 19
Harry Mitchell (GBR) | PTS
Carlo Saraudi (ITA) | L
Sverre Sørsdal (NOR) | L
Thyge Petersen (DEN) | PTS

Final; July 20
Harry Mitchell (GBR) | PTS
Thyge Petersen (DEN) | L
Bronze medal bout
Sverre Sørsdal (NOR) | W
Carlo Saraudi (ITA) | w/o

== Sources ==
- official report
- Wudarski, Pawel (1999). "Wyniki Igrzysk Olimpijskich" (in Polish).
