= Alfred Jackson (boxer) =

British boxer

Personal information
- Nationality: British
- Born: 14 January 1896; London, England
- Died: 13 February 1980 (aged 84); London, England

Sport
- Sport: Boxing

Alfred Jackson (14 January 1896 – 13 February 1980) was a British boxer. He competed in the men's light heavyweight event at the 1928 Summer Olympics. In his first fight, he defeated Alf Cleverley of New Zealand, before losing to Karel Miljon of the Netherlands.

Jackson won the Amateur Boxing Association 1927 and 1928 light heavyweight title, when boxing out of the St. Pancras ABC.
