= Paulina Radziulytė =

Lithuanian athlete

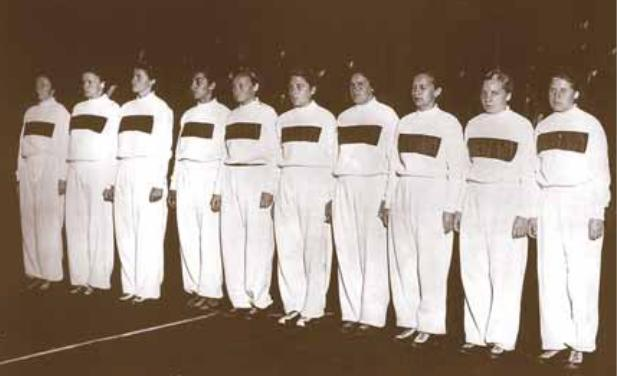
- Radziulytė with the Lithuanian basketball team at EuroBasket 1938

Personal information
- Nationality: Lithuanian
- Born: 14 February 1905 Velikiye Luki, Russian Empire
- Died: 19 June 1986 (aged 81) Sharon, Massachusetts, U.S.

Sport
- Sport: Athletics, basketball
- Club: Lietuvos fizinio lavinimosi sąjunga (LFLS)

Paulina Radziulytė-Kalvaitienė (14 February 1905 – 19 June 1986) was a Lithuanian athlete and basketball player. She was the first woman representative of Lithuania at the Olympic Games, and a silver medalist at the EuroBasket Women 1938. She was one of the most famous and accomplished sportswomen in inter-war Lithuania.

As an athlete, she competed in various events, but mostly in sprints and middle-distance running. She competed in the women's 800 metres at the 1928 Summer Olympics. She was a Lithuanian champion in athletics 27 times and achieved Lithuanian national records 26 times. Five times (in 1927, 1928, 1934, 1936, and 1937) she was Lithuanian champion in women's basketball with the LFLS team. With the LFLS team she also won gold in women's basketball at the first Lithuanian National Olympics in July 1938. A member of the Lithuanian team, she won silver at the EuroBasket Women 1938.

During World War II, she retreated to Germany and moved to Switzerland and Australia, eventually settling in Boston, Massachusetts in 1958. In 1961–1981, she worked as a teacher at a Lithuanian school and was active in scouting. She directed school's plays and published a collection of plays in 1976.

== Lithuanian athletics champion ==
Radziulytė won gold in the following events at the Lithuanian Athletics Championships:

- 60 metres: 1926, 1927
- 100 metres: 1928, 1932, 1934, 1935
- 200 metres: 1927–1929, 1932, 1934, 1935
- 400 metres: 1923, 1924
- 800 metres: 1928, 1929
- 1000 metres: 1927
- 4 × 100 metres relay: 1926–1928, 1935
- Long jump: 1924, 1927
- High jump: 1927
- Shot put: 1923, 1924
- Triathlon (100 metres, long jump, and shot put): 1935

== National records ==
Radziulytė held the following national records:

- 60 metres: three times, from 8.5 seconds in 1926 to 8.1 seconds in 1929
- 100 metres: four times, from 14.9 seconds in 1924 to 13.3 seconds in 1935
- 200 metres: four times, from 29.4 seconds in 1927 to 27.9 seconds in 1934
- 400 metres: three times, from 1:13.7 in 1923 to 1:07.4 in 1932
- 800 metres: twice, from 2:46.3 in 1928 to 2:45.2 in 1929
- 4 × 100 metres relay: 57.2 seconds in 1927
- Long jump: 4.32 metres in 1926
- High jump: twice, 1.30 and 1.31 metres in 1927
- Shot put: four times, from 7.60 metres in 1924 to 9.04 metres in 1931
- Javelin throw: 21.62 metres in 1924
- Triathlon (100 metres, long jump, and shot put): 939 points in 1935
