= Viktoras Ražaitis =

Lithuanian javelin thrower (1907–1990)

Personal information
- Nationality: Lithuanian
- Born: 9 November 1907 Sasnava, Russian Empire
- Died: 20 July 1990 (aged 82) Kaunas, Soviet Union

Sport
- Sport: Athletics
- Event: Javelin throw

Viktoras Ražaitis (9 November 1907 – 20 July 1990) was a Lithuanian athlete. He competed in the men's javelin throw at the 1928 Summer Olympics.
