= Emil Johansson (boxer) =

Swedish boxer (1907–1986)

Emil Olof Johansson (later Vallsäter, 11 September 1907 – 10 December 1986) was a Swedish boxer who competed in the 1928 Summer Olympics.

He was born and died in Stockholm.

In 1928 he was eliminated in the first round of the light heavyweight class after losing his fight to the upcoming bronze medalist Karel Miljon.
