= Domenico Ceccarelli =

Italian boxer

Domenico Ceccarelli (18 August 1905 – October 1985) was an Italian boxer who competed in the 1928 Summer Olympics.

He was born in Rome.

In 1928, he was eliminated in the first round of the light heavyweight class after losing his fight to Don McCorkindale.
