= Sergeant major instructor =

Appointment in the British Army

Sergeant major instructor (SMI) is a British Army appointment held by warrant officers class 1 in the Small Arms School Corps and the Army Physical Training Corps and by some WO1s in the Royal Engineers.

== Cadet forces ==
It is also a rank held by some of the civilian adult instructors in the Army Cadet Force, ranking between staff sergeant instructor and regimental sergeant major instructor. SMIs of the ACF do not hold a warrant and thus are not warrant officers, although their badges of rank are similar to those of an army warrant officer class 2.
