= Jurgis Gedminas =

Lithuanian cyclist

Personal information
- Born: 1902

Cycling career
- Sport: Cycling

Jurgis Gedminas (born 1902, date of death unknown) was a Lithuanian cyclist. He competed in the individual road race at the 1928 Summer Olympics.
