= Carlo Saraudi =

Italian boxer (1899–1973)

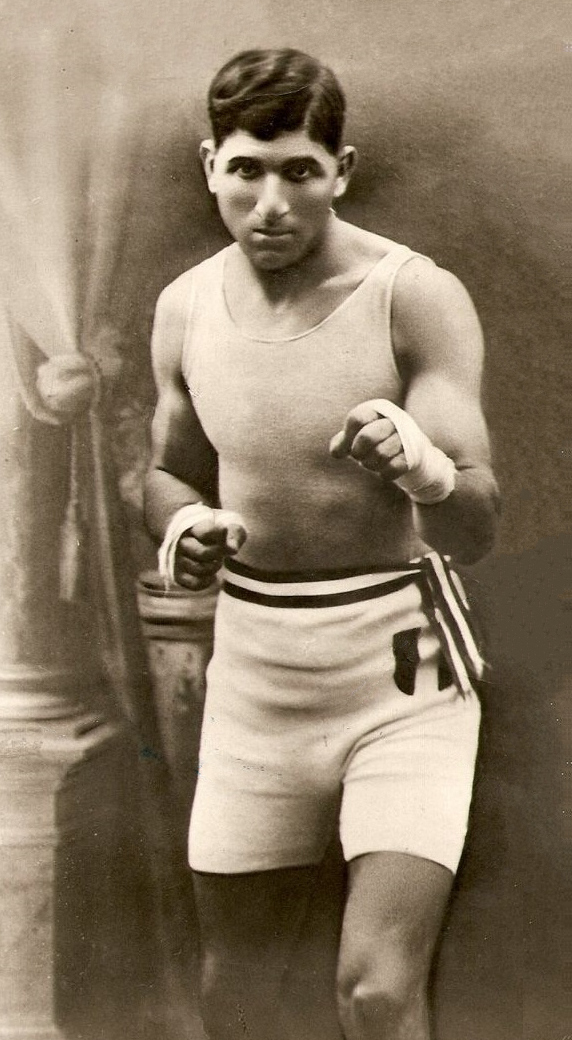

Personal information
- Born: 4 February 1899 Civitavecchia, Italy
- Died: 22 November 1973 (aged 74) Civitavecchia, Italy

Sport
- Sport: Boxing

Carlo Saraudi (4 February 1899 – 22 November 1973) was an Italian boxer. He competed at the 1924 Summer Olympics in the light heavyweight division. He lost the semifinal to Harry Mitchell, but did not compete for the bronze medal because the Italian Boxing Federation withdrew its athletes in a protest against the tournaments earlier referee decisions; thus Saraudi ended up in the fourth place.

In 1926–1932 he fought five bouts as a professional, winning three, losing one and drawing one. He later trained his sons Giulio and Vittorio, who both became elite light-heavyweight boxers.
