= Georges Rossignon =

French boxer

Georges Rossignon (23 April 1900 – 12 December 1974) was a French boxer who competed in the 1924 Summer Olympics. In 1924 he was eliminated in the quarter-finals of the light heavyweight class after losing his fight to the eventual gold medalist Harry Mitchell.

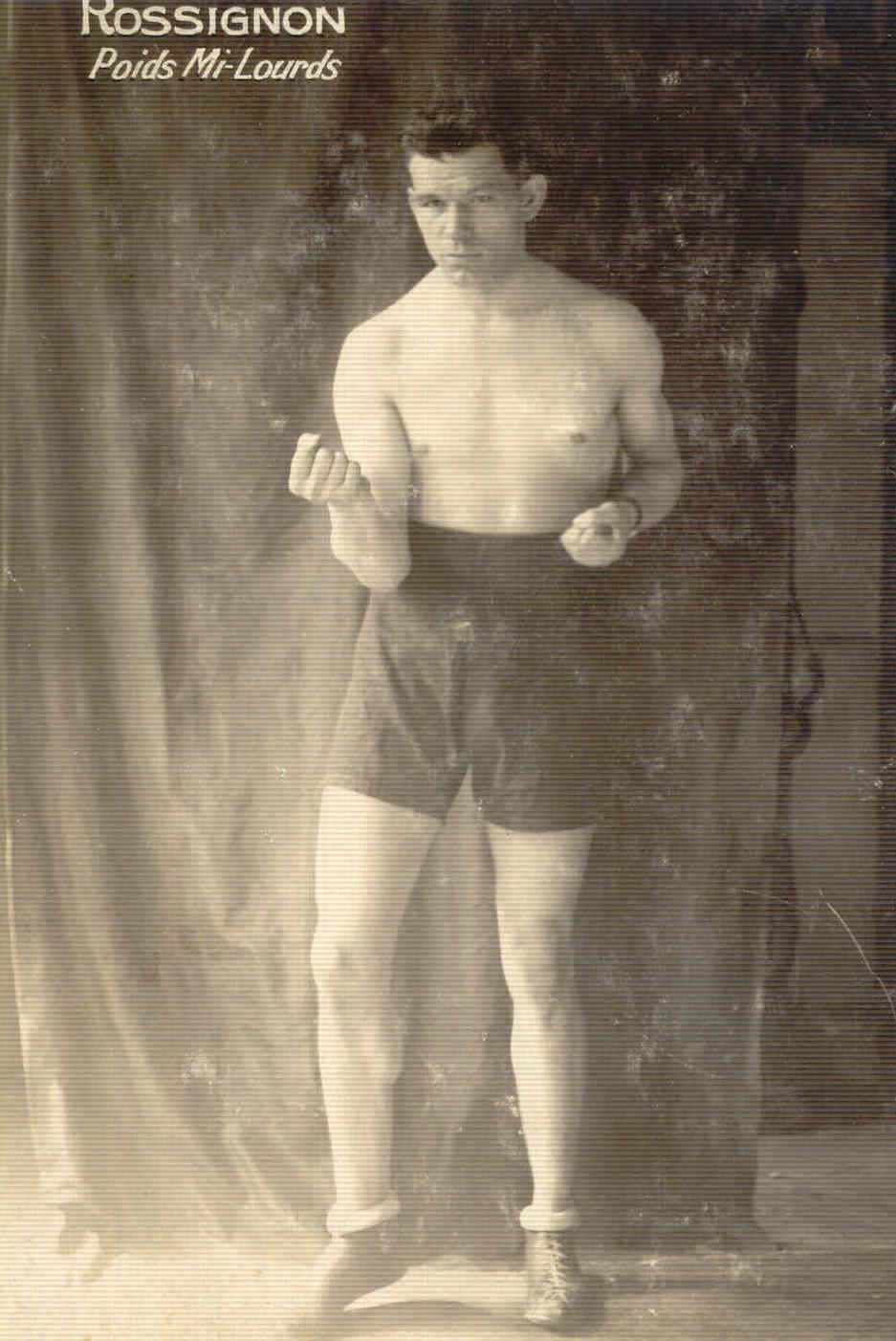
Rossignon Georges in sport gear
