= Don McCorkindale =

South African boxer (1904–1970)

Personal information
- Nationality: South African
- Born: 16 August 1904 Pretoria, Transvaal Colony
- Died: 11 August 1970 (aged 65) Edenvale, Transvaal, South Africa

Sport
- Sport: boxing

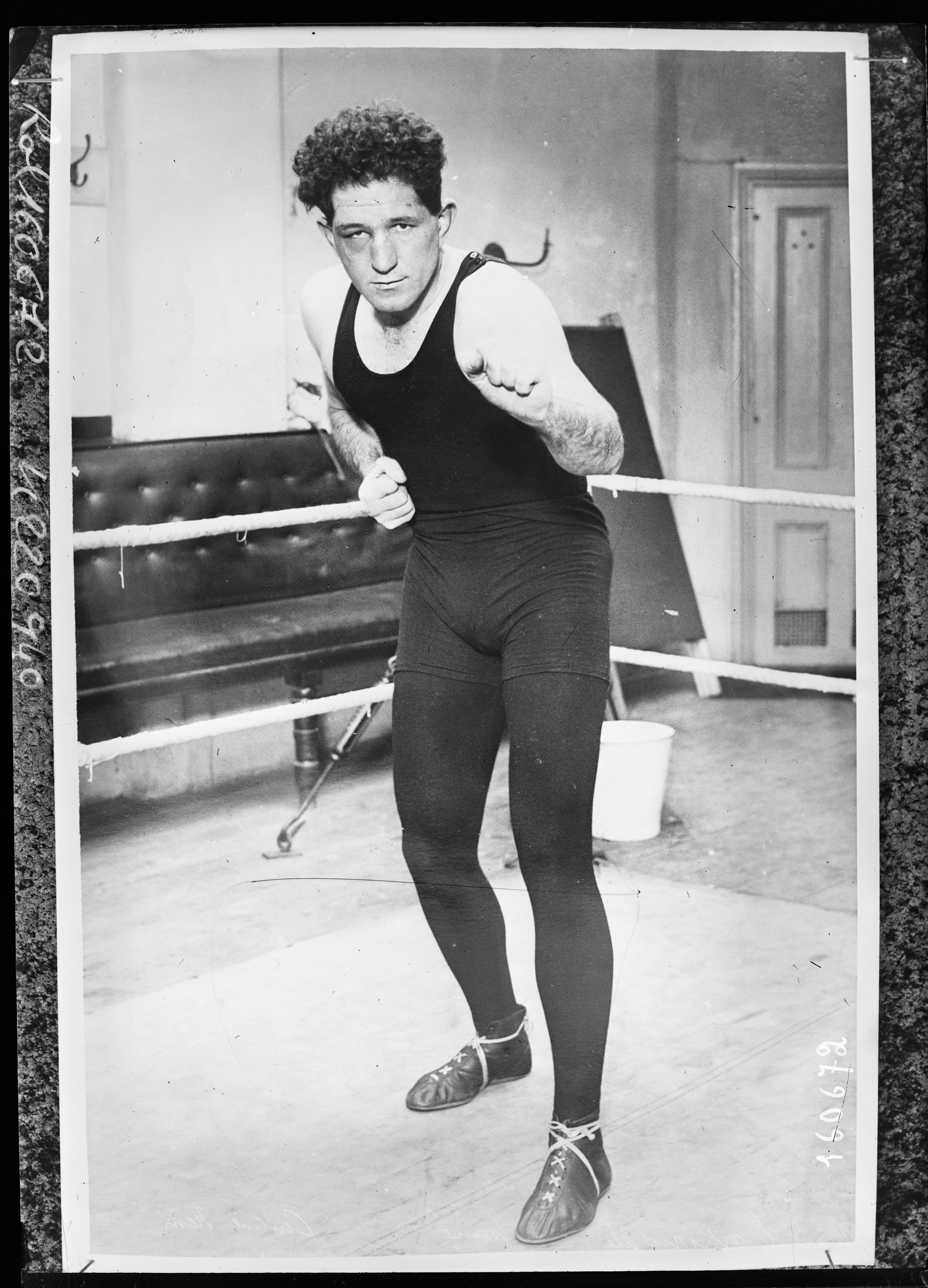
McCorkindale in January 1932

Donald Dinnie McCorkindale (16 August 1904 – 11 August 1970) was a South African boxer who competed in the 1928 Summer Olympics. He fought as Don McCorkindale.

== Biography ==
He was born in Pretoria, Transvaal Colony and died in Edenvale, Transvaal.

McCorkindale won the Amateur Boxing Association of England 1926 light heavyweight title. Two years later in 1928 he finished fourth in the light heavyweight class at the 1928 Summer Olympics, after losing the bronze medal bout to Karel Miljon.

=== 1928 Olympic results ===
Below are the results of Don McCorkindale, a South African light heavyweight boxer who competed in the 1928 Amsterdam Olympics:

- Round of 16: defeated Domenico Ceccarelli (Italy) on points
- Quarterfinal: defeated Juozas Vinca (Lithuania) by second-round knockout
- Semifinal: lost to Victor Avendano (Argentina) on points
- Bronze Medal Match: lost to Karel Miljin (Netherlands) on points
