= John Courtis =

British boxer (1902–1975)

John Courtis (22 August 1902 – 30 June 1975) was a British boxer who competed in the 1924 Summer Olympics. In 1924 he was eliminated in the quarterfinals of the light heavyweight class after losing his fight to Carlo Saraudi.
