= Donald Carrick =

Canadian boxer and politician

Donald Day Carrick OBE
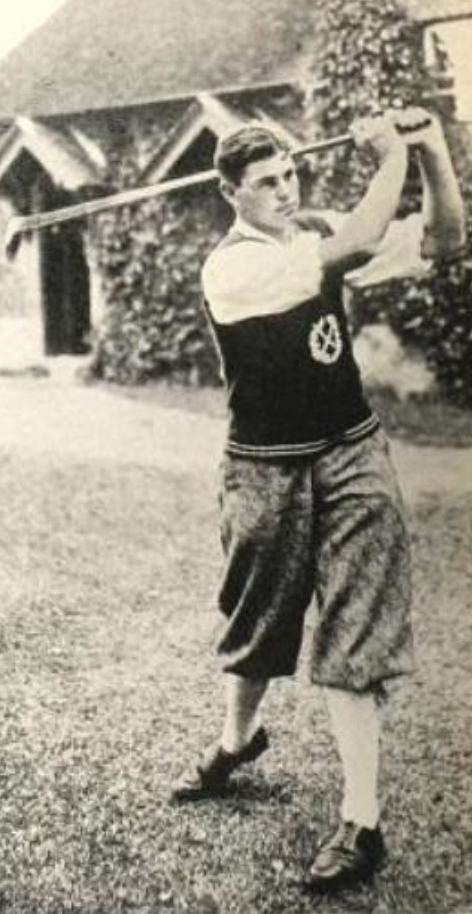
- Donald Carrick, from a 1925 publication

Member of the Canadian Parliament for Trinity
- In office November 11, 1954 – June 9, 1957
- Preceded by: Lionel Conacher
- Succeeded by: Stanley Haidasz

Personal details
- Born: September 18, 1906 Port Arthur, Ontario, Canada
- Died: February 28, 1997 (aged 90)
- Party: Liberal
- Education: University of Toronto; Osgoode Hall Law School; Harvard Law School

Donald Day Carrick, OBE, (September 18, 1906 – February 28, 1997) was an Ontario lawyer, political figure, Olympic boxer, and Canadian national golf champion. He represented Toronto Trinity as a Liberal member from 1954 to 1957.

== Biography ==
Carrick was born in Port Arthur, Ontario, the son of John James Carrick. He studied at the University of Toronto, Osgoode Hall Law School, and Harvard Law School. He represented Canada as a light-heavyweight boxer at the 1928 Summer Olympics in Amsterdam, where he won his first-round bout against Jean Welter of Luxembourg, but then lost on points to the eventual Olympic champion, Víctor Avendaño of Argentina. In golf, he was coached as a youth by Newell Senour at the Scarboro Club, won the 1923 Ontario Junior Championship, the Canadian Amateur Championship in 1925 and 1927, and the Ontario Amateur Championship in 1926 and 1933. Carrick served as a Lieutenant-Colonel in the Canadian Army during World War II. He was elected to the House of Commons of Canada in a 1954 by-election, held after the death of Lionel Conacher.

Carrick played golf recreationally after 1933, at the Scarboro and Rosedale Golf Clubs in Toronto. He was elected to the Canadian Golf Hall of Fame in 1997.

== Electoral record ==
November 8, 1954 by-election following Conacher's death
Party	Candidate	Votes
Liberal	Donald Carrick	5,589
Progressive Conservative	Willson Woodside	4,237
Co-operative Commonwealth	Herman A. Voaden	3,700
Labor–Progressive	William Kashtan	953
