= Tom Kirby (boxer) =

American boxer

Thomas Joseph Kirby (December 21, 1904 – November 25, 1967) was an American boxer who competed in the 1924 Summer Olympics. He was born in Boston, Massachusetts. In 1924 he was eliminated in the quarterfinals of the light heavyweight class after losing to the upcoming bronze medalist Sverre Sørsdal.
