= Adolfas Akelaitis =

Lithuanian high jumper

Personal information
- Nationality: Lithuanian
- Born: 16 January 1910 Marijampolė, Russian Empire
- Died: 21 December 2007 (aged 97) Colleyville, Texas, U.S.

Sport
- Sport: Athletics
- Event: High jump

Adolfas Akelaitis (16 January 1910 – 21 December 2007) was a Lithuanian high jumper and farmer. Akelaitis would compete at the 1928 Summer Olympics, representing Lithuania. He would be one of the first Lithuanian athletics competitors to compete at an Olympic Games and would be the first Lithuanian athlete to compete in the men's high jump at a Summer Games. There, he would place 33rd in the qualifying round and would not advance to the finals.

Later on, he would join the Lithuanian Army and studied at the University of Liège and University of Vienna. He would then work at Lietukas, the largest import-export company in the nation, and would move and later set up an import-export in the United States in 1938. There, he would meet his wife and would reside in multiple New York sites but would eventually reside in Raritan Township in New Jersey after buying a farm there in 1946. Akelaitis would work as a farmer and would reside in Colleyville, Texas after his wife's death.

== Biography ==
Adolfas Akelaitis was born on 16 January 1910 in Marijampolė in what was then the Russian Empire. Akelaitis would compete at the 1928 Summer Olympics in Amsterdam, Netherlands, representing Lithuania in men's athletics. He would be one of the first Lithuanian athletics competitors to compete at an Olympic Games and would be the first Lithuanian athlete to compete in the high jump at a Summer Games.

He would compete in the qualifying round of the men's high jump on 29 July against 35 other competitors. There, he would record a height of 1.60 metres at his best, placing last out of the 33 competitors that completed the event. He would not advance to the finals held on the same day.

After the 1928 Summer Games, Akelaitis would serve in the Lithuanian Army. For his education, he would study the French language at the University of Liège and business at the University of Vienna. He would then work at Lietukas, the largest import-export company in the nation. In 1938, he would move to the United States and started an import-export corporation in New York City. There, he would meet his soon wife Alice Pelkus and later marry in September 1939.

They would reside in Queens and later Rockville Centre, but would settle in Raritan Township in New Jersey after buying a farm there in 1946. From then on, Akelaitis would live as a farmer. After his wife's death, he would reside in Colleyville, Texas in 2003 until his death on 21 December 2007.
