= Vladas Jankauskas (cyclist) =

Lithuanian cyclist (1903–1969)

Personal information
- Born: 10 May 1903
- Died: March 1969 Jamaica, Queens, United States

Cycling career
- Sport: Cycling

Vladas Jankauskas (Lithuanian: Władysław Jankowski; 10 May 1903 – March 1969) was a Lithuanian cyclist of Polish ethnicity, member of the Polish Sports Club Sparta Kaunas. He competed in the individual road race at the 1928 Summer Olympics.
