= Juozas Vinča =

Lithuanian boxer (1905–1990)

Juozas Vinča (27 November 1905, in Šiauliai – 29 August 1990, in Boston, MA) was a Lithuanian boxer who competed at the 1928 Summer Olympics, representing Lithuania.

== Biography ==
Vinča started his sports career in 1925 with weightlifting, but Steponas Darius persuaded him to switch to boxing. By 1926, Vinča had become the Lithuanian champion. In 1927 and 1928, he became the Baltic champion when he defeated boxers from Latvia, Estonia, and East Prussia.

In the 1928 Olympics, he was eliminated in the second round of the light heavyweight class after losing his fight to Don McCorkindale. That was the best result for Lithuania, which was competing in the Olympics for the second time. His achievement helped to popularize boxing among Lithuanian youth.

After the Olympics, Vinča became a professional boxer. He moved to the United States, where he was managed by the men who also managed Jack Sharkey. In 1931, he injured his wrist and returned to Lithuania. In 1932, he attempted to restart his career in France, but the injury renewed. He then took up wrestling and competed in England and France. When he retired, Vinča served with the Lithuanian police in Klaipėda (1934–1938). During World War II, he retreated to Germany and from there to the United States. He competed in American wrestling competitions until 1954.
