= Sergio Ojeda Dóren =

Chilean boxer and politician

Member of the Chamber of Deputies of Chile
- In office 1953–1957

Personal details
- Born: 23 January 1906 Santiago, Chile
- Died: 1 January 1996 (aged 89) Los Angeles, California, U.S.
- Party: PAL
- Education: Pontifical Catholic University of Chile

Sergio Ojeda Dóren (23 January 1906 – 1 January 1996) was a Chilean boxer and politician. He competed in the light heavyweight event at the 1928 Summer Olympics. Aside from boxing, he served in the Chamber of Deputies of Chile from 1953 to 1957.

Dóren died in Los Angeles, California on 1 January 1996, at the age of 89.
