= Young Firpo =

American boxer

Personal information
- Nicknames: Wild Bull of Idaho, The Bull of Burke
- Nationality: (United States) American
- Born: Guido Bardelli; April 25, 1907 Barre, Vermont
- Died: August 21, 1984 (aged 77)
- Height: 5 ft 7 1/2 in (171 cm)
- Weight: Light-heavyweight

Boxing career
- Reach: 72 in (183 cm)
- Stance: Orthodox

Boxing record
- Total fights: 93
- Wins: 74
- Win by KO: 45
- Losses: 15
- Draws: 4
- No contests: 0

Young Firpo (April 25, 1907 – August 21, 1984) was an American professional light-heavyweight boxer. He began his career in Burke, Idaho. He was a popular fighter in the Pacific Northwest during the 1920s and 1930s, particularly in Portland, Oregon. He was also a ranked Light-Heavyweight contender during the early 1930s.

He took his nickname from Luis Firpo.

== Honors ==
- Inducted into the Idaho Sports Hall of Fame, March 15, 1974.
- Inducted into the World Boxing Hall of Fame: Class of 2008.
