= Julius Petraitis =

Lithuanian long-distance runner (born 1905)

Personal information
- Nationality: Lithuanian
- Born: 1905

Sport
- Sport: Long-distance running
- Event: 5000 metres

Julius Petraitis (born 1905, date of death unknown) was a Lithuanian long-distance runner. He competed in the men's 5000 metres at the 1928 Summer Olympics.
