= Thyge Petersen =

Danish boxer (1902–1964)

Personal information
- Nationality: Danish
- Born: 28 May 1902 Horsens, Denmark
- Died: 1 January 1964 (aged 61) Odense, Denmark

Sport
- Sport: boxing
Medal record
Representing Denmark
Men's Boxing
Olympic Games
Silver medal – second place	1924 Paris	Light heavyweight
European Amateur Championships
Gold medal – first place	1925 Stockholm	Light heavyweight

Thyge Alexander Petersen (28 May 1902 – 1 January 1964) was a Danish light heavyweight amateur boxer who competed in the 1920s. He won the European championship in 1925 and 1930.

== Biography ==
Thyge Petersen was born on 28 May 1902 in Horsens, Denmark. In 1922 he won the regional championship for Jutland as a middleweight. The following year he won the Danish championship in the light heavyweight division and in 1924 he won the regional Jutland-championship as well as the Danish championship. Later in 1924 he won a silver medal in boxing at the 1924 Summer Olympics in Paris, losing against the British boxer Harry Mitchell in the final bout.

After the Olympics Thyge Petersen remained an amateur boxer and won the regional Jutland championship three times (1925–26 and 1928) and the Danish championship four times (1925, 1927–28 and 1930. In 1926 he won the Danish championship as a heavyweight. He also won the Amateur Boxing Association of England 1926 heavyweight title.

Thyge Petersen participated in the 1925 European Amateur Boxing Championships and the 1930 European Amateur Boxing Championships and won the European championship in light heavyweight on both occasions. Winning two European championships, an olympic silver medal, 7 national and 4 regional championships, Thyge Petersen is one of the most successful Danish amateur boxers.

While he was an amateur boxer, he worked as a police officer. Later in life he had a small cornerstore in Odense.

He died on 1 January 1964.
