= Harry Mitchell (boxer) =

English boxer (1898–1983)

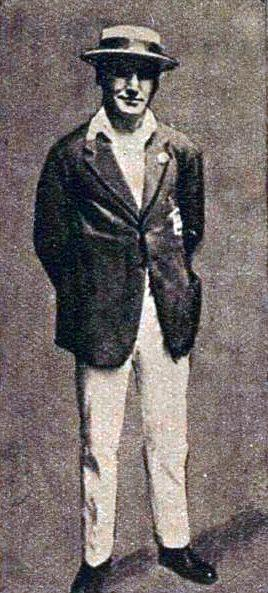

Personal information
- Nationality: British (English)
- Born: 5 January 1898 Tiverton, Devon, England
- Died: 8 February 1983 (aged 85) Twickenham, London, England

Sport
- Sport: boxing
Medal record
Representing Great Britain
Men's Boxing
Gold medal – first place	1924 Paris	Light heavyweight

Harold James Mitchell (5 January 1898 – 8 February 1983) was an English boxer who competed in the 1924 Summer Olympics. He won the gold medal in the light heavyweight competition after beating Thyge Petersen in the final.

== Amateur career ==
Mitchell was a four-time Amateur Boxing Association champion in the light heavyweight class (1922–25), when boxing out of the Polytechnic Boxing Club.

== His legacy ==
Today, located in the UK, there is a leisure centre that bears his name - the Harry Mitchell Leisure Centre - which has a fully equipped Hammer Strength brand weights gym, a gym that has entry only for women, and classes for badminton, fitness and various other indoor team sports.
