= Boxing at the 1924 Summer Olympics – Bantamweight =

Bantamweight boxing at the Games of the VIII Olympiad
- Venue: Vélodrome d'hiver
- Dates: July 15–20, 1924
- Competitors: 21 from 15 nations

Medalists
1st place, gold medalist(s)		William Smith; South Africa
2nd place, silver medalist(s)		Salvatore Tripoli; United States
3rd place, bronze medalist(s)		Jean Ces; France

The men's bantamweight event was part of the boxing programme at the 1924 Summer Olympics. The weight class was the second-lightest contested and allowed boxers of up to 118 pounds (53.5 kilograms). The competition was held from July 15 to July 20, 1924. Twenty-one boxers from 15 nations competed.

In their round of 16 bout, Joseph Lazarus knocked out Oscar Andrén, but Lazarus was disqualified for hitting Andrén in a clinch a few seconds before the knockout punch.

== Results ==
Round of 32; July 15
Jean Ces (FRA)	PTS
Domenico Bernasconi (ITA)	L
François Sybille (BEL)	PTS
Franz Barta (AUT)	L
Oscar Andrén (SWE)	PTS
Mario González (URU)	L
Benjamín Pertuzzo (ARG)	PTS
Armando Ricciardi (ITA)	L
Salvatore Tripoli (USA)	PTS
Carlos Uzabeaga (CHI)	L

Round of 16; July 16
William H. Smith (RSA)	PTS
Harry Wolff (SWE)	L
Jacques Lemouton (FRA)	PTS
José Pastor (ESP)	L
Alf Barber (GBR)	PTS
Arij Smit (NED)	L
Jean Ces (FRA)	PTS
François Sybille (BEL)	L
Antonio Sánchez (ESP)	PTS
Johann Weidel (SUI)	L
Oscar Andrén (SWE)	W
Joseph Lazarus (USA)	DQ2
Robert Hilliard (IRL)	L
Benjamín Pertuzzo (ARG)	PTS
Salvatore Tripoli (USA)	PTS
Les Tarrant (GBR)	L

Quarterfinals; July 18
William H. Smith (RSA)	PTS
Jacques Lemouton (FRA)	L
Alf Barber (GBR)	L
Jean Ces (FRA)	PTS
Antonio Sánchez (ESP)	L
Oscar Andrén (SWE)	PTS
Benjamín Pertuzzo (ARG)	L
Salvatore Tripoli (USA)	PTS

Semifinals; July 19
William H. Smith (RSA)	PTS
Jean Ces (FRA)	L
Oscar Andrén (SWE)	L
Salvatore Tripoli (USA)	PTS

Final; July 20
William H. Smith (RSA)	PTS
Salvatore Tripoli (USA)	L
Bronze medal bout
Jean Ces (FRA)	PTS
Oscar Andrén (SWE)	L

== Sources ==
- official report
- Wudarski, Pawel (1999). "Wyniki Igrzysk Olimpijskich" (in Polish).
