= Miklós Gelbai =

Hungarian boxer (1909–1973)

Personal information
- Nationality: Hungarian
- Born: 23 December 1909 Kecskemét, Austria-Hungary
- Died: 29 August 1973 (aged 63)

Sport
- Sport: Boxing
Medal record
Men's amateur boxing
Representing Hungary
European Amateur Championships
Bronze medal – third place	1927 Berlin	Featherweight

Miklós Gelbai (23 December 1909 – 29 August 1973) was a Hungarian boxer. He competed in the men's featherweight event at the 1928 Summer Olympics. At the 1928 Summer Olympics, he lost to Fred Perry of Great Britain.
