= Juan Muñoz (boxer) =

Spanish boxer

Personal information
- Nationality: Spanish
- Born: 1907; Barcelona, Spain
- Died: 1 September 1972 (aged 64–65); Barcelona, Spain

Sport
- Sport: Boxing

Juan Muñoz (1907 – 1 September 1972) was a Spanish boxer. He competed in the men's featherweight event at the 1928 Summer Olympics. In his first fight, he lost to Bep van Klaveren of the Netherlands.
