= Armando Ricciardi =

Italian boxer

Armando Ricciardi (1 April 1905 – unknown) was an Italian boxer who competed in the 1924 Summer Olympics. In 1924 at the age of 19, he was eliminated in the first round of the bantamweight class after losing his fight to Salvatore Tripoli on a decision.
