= Arthur Olsen (boxer, born 1907) =

Norwegian boxer

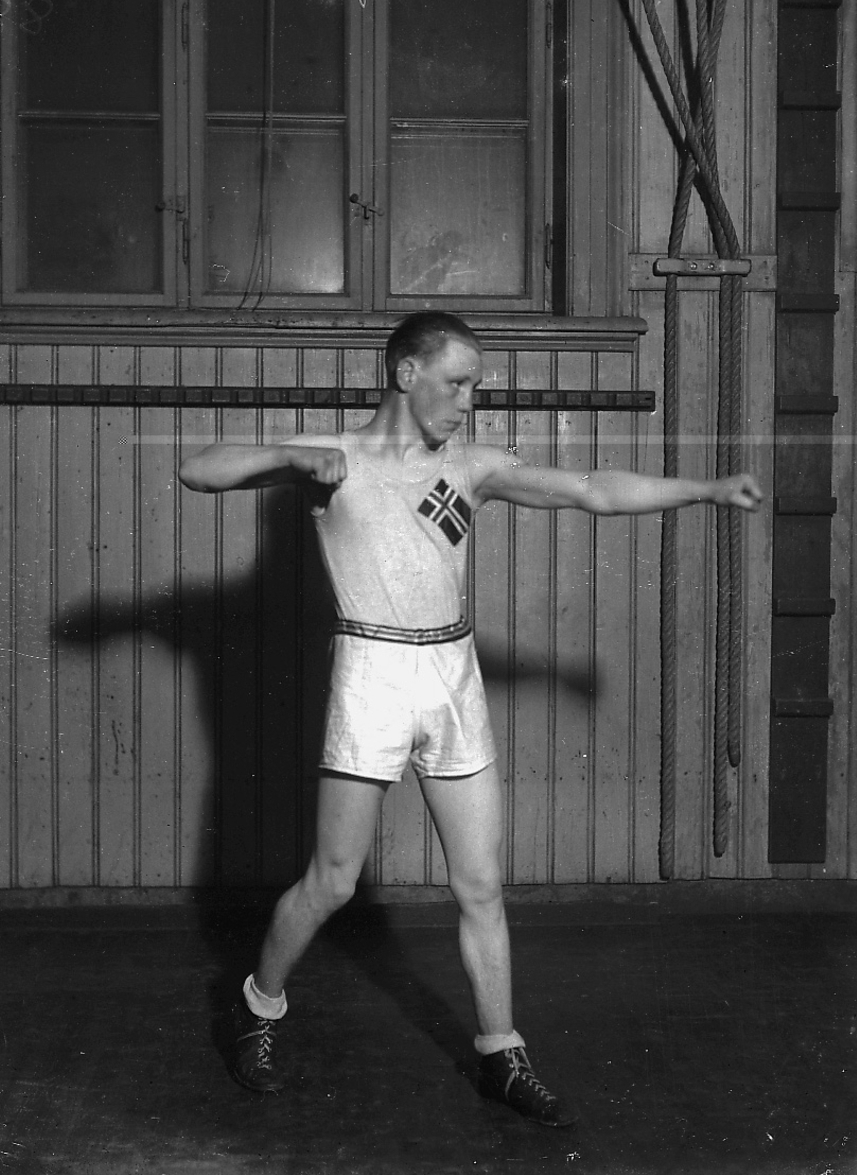

Arthur Olsen (March 19, 1907 – October 17, 1943) was a Norwegian boxer who competed in the 1928 Summer Olympics.

In 1928 he was eliminated in the second round of the featherweight class after losing his fight to the upcoming silver medalist Víctor Peralta.
