= Arij Smit =

Dutch boxer

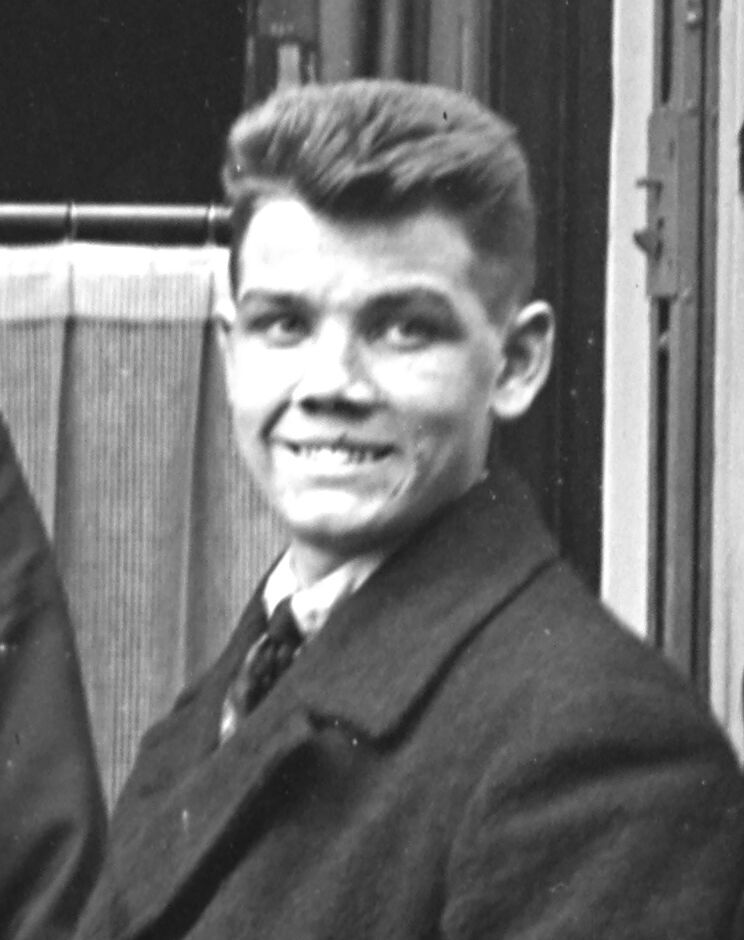
Arij Smit in 1924

Arij Smit (7 July 1907 – 30 April 1970) was a Dutch boxer who competed in the 1924 Summer Olympics. He was born in Schiedam and died in Haarlem. In 1924 he was eliminated in the second round of the bantamweight class after losing his fight to Alf Barber of Great Britain.
