= José Pastor =

José Pastor may refer to:

- José Pastor (boxer) (born 1906), Spanish boxer
- José Pastor (actor) (born 1996), Spanish actor
