= Joseph Lazarus =

American boxer

Joseph Ashur Lazarus (December 18, 1903 – June 21, 1943) was an American boxer who competed in the 1924 Summer Olympics. He was born in Bayonne, New Jersey and attended Cornell University.

In 1924 he was eliminated in the second round of the bantamweight class after being disqualified in his fight with Oscar Andrén. Lazarus, who was favored to win his class, had knocked out Andrén, but the referee had determined that Lazarus had hit Andrén while in a clinch position. Neither the American nor the Swedish boxers, nor their corner teams had heard the referee's warning. Lazarus declined to protest the decision. The referee later apologized to Lazarus after the decision.

From the 1924 US Olympic Report: "A short time later came the announcement that the referee had dis qualified the American, and this was greeted with considerable disapproval by many of the fans who were assembled at the ringside, as they could not understand how the American could be ruled out of the competition. There was no claim of “foul” made by the Swedish boxer or the manager of the Swedish team, but on the contrary the manager for the Swedish boxers informed the coach of the American boxers that he was perfectly willing to have the contest between the two boxers restaged, as he did not consider the verdict as one which would meet with the approval of the Swedish boxing fans. This was an excellent display of sportsmanship on the part of the representatives from Sweden, but the verdict of the referee was allowed to stand."

Lazarus later became an insurance broker. In 1943 he was killed after mediating a street brawl between a client and two British merchant seamen. After everyone had shaken hands, one of the sailors punched Lazarus through a drugstore window. An artery in his thigh was severed, and he bled to death.
