= Mario González (Uruguayan boxer) =

Uruguayan boxer

Mario González (25 November 1901 – 8 October 1968) was a Uruguayan boxer who competed in the 1924 Summer Olympics. In 1924 he was eliminated in the first round of the bantamweight class after losing his fight to Oscar Andrén.
