= Antonio Sánchez (boxer) =

Spanish boxer

Antonio Sánchez Dietz (born 11 June 1905; date of death unknown) was a Spanish boxer who competed in the 1924 Summer Olympics. In 1924 he was eliminated in the quarter-finals of the bantamweight class after losing his fight to Oscar Andrén.
