= Elimar Kloos =

German boxer

Elimar Kloos (born 15 February 1908 – 27 May 1991) was a German boxer who competed in the 1928 Summer Olympics. In 1928, he was eliminated in the second round of the featherweight class after losing his fight to Lucian Biquet.
