= Fausto Montefiore =

Italian boxer

Fausto Montefiori (born 16 March 1906; date of death unknown) was an Italian boxer who competed in the 1928 Summer Olympics.

In 1928 he was eliminated in the second round of the featherweight class after losing his fight to the upcoming bronze medalist Harold Devine.

== 1928 Olympic results ==
Below is the record of Fausto Montefiore, an Italian featherweight boxer who competed at the 1928 Amsterdam Olympics:

- Round of 32: bye
- Round of 16: lost to Harold Devine (United States) by decision
