= Rolf Gustafsson =

Swedish boxer

Rolf Gustafsson (December 18, 1906 – September 21, 1986) was a Swedish boxer who competed in the 1928 Summer Olympics. In 1928 he was eliminated in the first round of the featherweight class after losing his fight to Jean Boireau.
