= Robert Hilliard =

Irish boxer, politician, and minister

- Born: Robert Martin Hilliard; 7 April 1904; Lower New Street, central Killarney, County Kerry, Ireland
- Died: 22 February 1937 (aged 32); Castellón de la Plana, Spain
- Cause of death: Died of wounds
- Occupations: Boxer, minister
- Military Career
- Allegiance: Spanish Republic
- Branch: International Brigades
- Units: The "Abraham Lincoln" XV International Brigade; Connolly Column
- Conflicts: Spanish Civil War (DOW)

Robert Martin Hilliard (7 April 1904 – 22 February 1937) was an Olympic boxer, Irish republican, Church of Ireland minister and communist. He was killed in the Spanish Civil War fighting in the International Brigades.

== Biography ==
Hilliard was born in Lower Main Street, central Killarney, County Kerry, Ireland. His father's family were prosperous shop owners. Robert was educated at Cork Grammar School and then Mountjoy School in Dublin. He won a Read Sizarship to Trinity College Dublin in 1921. There he became interested in republican politics, co-founding the College's Thomas Davis Society and participating in the latter stages of the Irish Civil War.

Hilliard was interested in a variety of sports and was a founding member of Trinity's hurling club. In 1923 he was champion of the Irish Amateur Boxing Association and of British and Irish Universities. He fought in the bantamweight class at the 1924 Olympics, representing Ireland. He got a bye in the first round and lost on points to Benjamín Pertuzzo in the second round.

Hilliard left Trinity in 1925 without a degree. In 1926 he married Edith Rosemary Robins born 1905 in Ngara, Nyasaland, Africa, daughter of Stephen Robins and Rose Melicent Baker of Kingswood Hanger in Gomshall, Surrey. They moved to nearby Hindhead where he worked as a journalist and in advertising. The couple had four children. Hilliard became interested in the Oxford Group of evangelical Christians. He resumed his studies at Trinity and in 1931 was conferred with a B.A. Degree and letters testimonial for ordination. He was ordained a Church of Ireland priest in 1932, and worked in the mission to the poor attached to St Anne’s Cathedral, Belfast.

Hilliard's socialist beliefs overcame his religious calling; he abandoned his family and ministry and went to London, where he joined the Communist Party of Great Britain and returned to journalism. He subsequently joined the Communist Party of Ireland, becoming an atheist as well as a Marxist. He joined the International Brigades fighting for the Second Spanish Republic, either the Connolly Column of Irish volunteers or the British column. A comrade-in-arms recalled that he ostentatiously parodied the sign of the cross by reciting "In the name of Marx, Engels, Lenin, Stalin, Stakhanov, Dimitrov, the Party Line" while tracing the hammer and sickle with his hand. Hilliard was one of four riflemen in the rearguard covering the Republican retreat after the Battle of Jarama. All were killed, Hilliard dying of his wounds at Castellón de la Plana five days after being shot. Hilliard is among the combatants namechecked in Christy Moore's song Viva la Quinta Brigada about the Spanish Civil War and in Blanaid Salkeld's poem Casualties, writing "That Hilliard spilled his boxers' blood/ Through Albacete's snow and mud/ And smiled to Comrade Death: Salud!

== See also ==
- Irish socialist volunteers in the Spanish Civil War
