= Jan Górny =

Polish boxer

Jan Górny (14 August 1907 – 7 May 1945) was a Polish boxer who competed in the 1928 Summer Olympics.

He was born in Gliwice and died in Orglandes, France.

In 1928 he was eliminated in the quarter-finals of the featherweight class after losing his fight to Lucian Biquet.

During World War II Górny was forced to join the German Army, fought in France where was seriously injured and died in American military hospital in Orglandes.
