= Franz Barta =

Austrian boxer

Franz Barta (born 18 November 1902; date of death unknown) was an Austrian boxer who competed in the 1924 Summer Olympics. In 1924 he was eliminated in the first round of the bantamweight class after losing his fight to François Sybille.
