= François Sybille =

Belgian boxer

François Sybille boxing against Bep van Klaveren

François Sybille (9 October 1906, Liège – 1968) was a Belgian boxer who competed in the 1924 Summer Olympics. He was eliminated in the second round of the bantamweight class after losing his fight to the upcoming bronze medalist Jean Ces.
