= Víctor Peralta (boxer) =

Argentine boxer

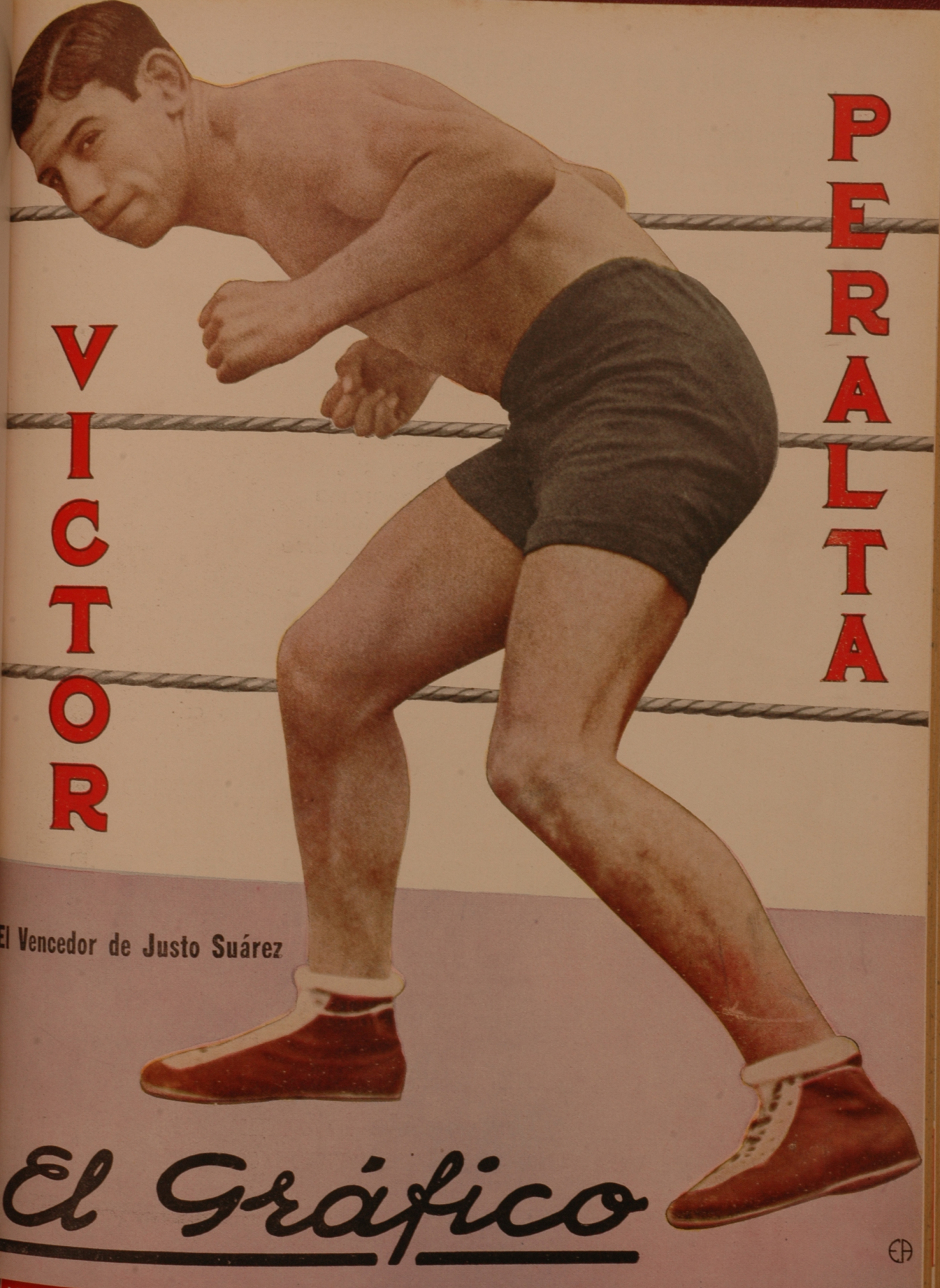
- Peralta in El Gráfico in 1932

Personal information
- Born: March 6, 1908 Buenos Aires, Argentina
- Died: December 25, 1995 (aged 87)
Medal record
Men's Boxing
Representing Argentina
Olympic Games
| Silver medal – second place | 1928 Amsterdam | Featherweight |

Víctor Peralta (March 6, 1908 – December 25, 1995) was an Argentine boxer who competed in the 1928 Summer Olympics in Amsterdam, Netherlands. He was born in Buenos Aires.

In 1928 he won the silver medal in the featherweight class after losing the final against Bep van Klaveren.

== 1928 Olympic results ==
Below are the results of Victor Peralta from the 1928 Olympic boxing tournament in Amsterdam. Peralta was a featherweight boxer who competed for Argentina.

- Round of 16: defeated Arthur Olsen II (Norway) on points
- Quarterfinal: defeated Georges Boireau (France) on points
- Semifinal: defeated Lucian Biquet (Belgium) on points
- Final: lost to Bep van Klaveren (Netherlands) on points (was awarded the silver medal)
