= Jacques Lemouton =

French boxer

Jacques Lemouton (11 July 1903 – 7 July 1962) was a French boxer. He competed in the 1924 Summer Olympics. In 1924, Lemouton was eliminated in the quarter-finals of the bantamweight class, after losing his fight to the upcoming gold medalist William H. Smith.
