= George Kelly (boxer) =

Irish boxer

Personal information
- Full name: George Joseph Kelly
- Nationality: Irish
- Born: 15 June 1908; Dublin, Ireland
- Died: 27 November 1988 (aged 80); Corby, England

Sport
- Sport: Boxing

George Kelly (15 June 1908 – 27 November 1988) was an Irish boxer. He competed in the men's featherweight event at the 1928 Summer Olympics. At the 1928 Summer Olympics, he lost to Ricardt Madsen of Denmark.
