= Naim Terbunja =

Swedish boxer

Personal information
- Full name: Naim Terbunja
- Nickname: The Albanian Warrior
- Nationality: Sweden
- Born: 28 September 1984 (age 42) Pristina, SFR Yugoslavia
- Height: 1.83 m (6 ft 0 in)
- Weight: 75 kg (165 lb)

Sport
- Sport: Boxing
- Weight class: Middleweight
- Club: Djurgårdens IF, Stockholm

Naim Terbunja (born 28 September 1984) is a Swedish professional boxer of Kosovar-Albanian descent who qualified for the 2008 Olympics at middleweight.

Terbunja lost his round of 32 match against Matvey Korobov 18 points to 6.

Terbunja captured the prestigious National Golden Gloves championship in Salt Lake City, winning five bouts in seven days. Capping that stretch, he defeated the top-ranked fighter in the country – Luis Arias of Wisconsin – 3–2, in the finals of the 165-pound division.

As an amateur boxer, Terbunja represented Djurgårdens IF.

== Professional boxing record ==
10 Wins (1 knockouts, 9 decisions), 2 Losses (0 knockouts, 2 decisions), 1 Draw
Result	Record	Opponent	Type	Round	Date	Location	Notes
Draw	10-2-1	(United States) Lanell Bellows	Draw	8	11 May 2018	Sam's Town Hotel & Gambling Hall, Las Vegas, United States	
Loss	10-2	(Sweden) Sven Fornling	UD	8	9 December 2016	Rosvalla Arena, Nyköping, Sweden	
Win	10-1	(France) Baptiste Castegnaro*	UD	6	10 September 2016	Hovet, Stockholm, Sweden	
Win	9-1	(Puerto Rico) Joel De La Paz	KO	1	23 July 2016	Mohegan Sun Casino, Uncasville, Connecticut, United States	
Win	8-1	(United States) Lanny Dardar	UD	6	17 June 2016	Paramount Theatre, Huntington, New York, United States	
Loss	7-1	(United States) Jason Escalera	SD	6	18 July 2014	Paramount Theatre, Huntington, New York, United States	
Win	7-0	(Poland) Bartlomiej Grafka	MD	4	26 April 2014	Amiralen, Malmö, Sweden	
Win	6-0	(United States) Maurice Amaro	UD	4	22 March 2014	Long Island City, United States	
Win	5-0	(Serbia) Srdjan Mihajlovic	UD	6	16 November 2012	Linköping, Sweden	
Win	4-0	(Poland) Bartlomiej Grafka	MD	6	6 October 2012	Pristina, Kosovo	
Win	3-0	(Lithuania) Kirill Psonko	UD	4	1 September 2012	Ystad, Sweden	
Win	2-0	(Croatia) Marijan Markovic	UD	4	14 July 2012	Podujevë, Kosovo	
Win	1-0	(Serbia) Vladimir Spasojevic	UD	4	27 April 2012	Linköping, Sweden	Debut
