= Carlos Uzabeaga =

Chilean boxer

Personal information
- Born: 5 December 1907 Santiago, Chile
- Died: 17 February 1964 (aged 56) Santiago, Chile

Sport
- Sport: Boxing

Carlos Uzabeaga (5 December 1907 – 17 February 1964) was a Chilean boxer. He competed in the men's bantamweight event at the 1924 Summer Olympics.
