= Gustaf Bergman =

Swedish boxer (1898–1971)

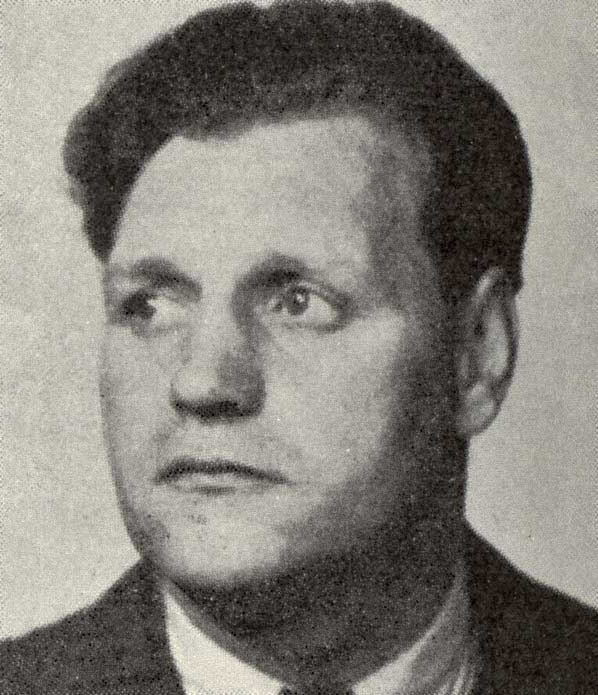

Personal information
- Full name: Gustaf Eugen Bergman
- Nickname: Gurra
- Nationality: Swedish
- Born: 8 February 1898 Stockholm, Sweden
- Died: 6 June 1971 (aged 73) Stockholm, Sweden

Sport
- Sport: Boxing
- Weight class: Featherweight
- Club: Djurgårdens IF, Stockholm
Medal record
Swedish Championship
Gold medal – first place	1922	Lightweight
Gold medal – first place	1923	Lightweight

Gustaf Eugen Bergman (8 February 1898 – 6 June 1971) was a Swedish boxer who competed in the 1924 Summer Olympics. He was eliminated by Carlos Abarca of Chile in the first round of the featherweight contest.

Bergman represented Djurgårdens IF.

== 1924 Olympic results ==
Below is the record of Gustaf Bergman, a Swedish featherweight boxer who competed at the 1924 Paris Olympics:

- Round of 32: lost to Carlos Abarca (Chile) by decision
