= Johann Weidel =

Swiss boxer (1904–?)

Johann Weidel (born 1904, date of death unknown) was a Swiss boxer. He competed in the men's bantamweight event at the 1924 Summer Olympics.
