= Frederick Volkert =

Canadian boxer

Personal information
- Born: 1 April 1903; Montreal, Quebec, Canada
- Died: 2 November 1953 (aged 50); Quebec, Canada

Sport
- Sport: Boxing

Ferdinand "Fred" Volkert (1 April 1903 – 2 November 1953) was a Canadian boxer. He competed in the men's featherweight event at the 1928 Summer Olympics.
