= Boxing at the 1928 Summer Olympics – Featherweight =

Boxing competitions

Men's featherweight boxing at the Games of the IX Olympiad
- Venue: Krachtsportgebouw
- Date: August 7–11, 1928
- Competitors: 18 from 18 nations

Medalists
1st place, gold medalist(s)		Bep van Klaveren	Netherlands
2nd place, silver medalist(s)		Víctor Peralta	Argentina
3rd place, bronze medalist(s)		Harold Devine	United States

The men's featherweight event was part of the boxing programme at the 1928 Summer Olympics. The weight class was the third-lightest contested, and allowed boxers of up to 126 pounds (57.2 kilograms). The competition was held from Tuesday, August 7, 1928 to Saturday, August 11, 1928.

== Results ==
Round of 32; August 7
Ricardt Madsen (DEN)	PTS
George Kelly (IRL)	L
Jean Boireau (FRA)	PTS
Rolf Gustafsson (SWE)	L

Round of 16; August 8
Harold Devine (USA)	PTS
Fausto Montefiore (ITA)	L
Kaarlo Väkevä (FIN)	PTS
Raúl Talán (MEX)	L
Bep van Klaveren (NED)	PTS
Juan Muñoz (ESP)	L
Fred Perry (GBR)	PTS
Miklós Gelbai (HUN)	L
Lucian Biquet (BEL)	PTS
Elimar Kloos (GER)	L
Jan Górny (POL)	PTS
Frederick Volkert (CAN)	L
Víctor Peralta (ARG)	PTS
Arthur Olsen II (NOR)	L
Ricardt Madsen (DEN)	L
Jean Boireau (FRA)	PTS

Quarterfinals; August 9
Harold Devine (USA)	PTS
Kaarlo Väkevä (FIN)	L
Bep van Klaveren (NED)	PTS
Fred Perry (GBR)	L
Lucian Biquet (BEL)	PTS
Jan Górny (POL)	L
Víctor Peralta (ARG)	PTS
Jean Boireau (FRA)	L

Semifinals; August 10
Harold Devine (USA)	L
Bep van Klaveren (NED)	PTS
Lucian Biquet (BEL)	L
Víctor Peralta (ARG)	PTS

Final; August 11
Bep van Klaveren (NED)	PTS
Víctor Peralta (ARG)	L
Bronze medal bout
Harold Devine (USA)	PTS
Lucian Biquet (BEL)	L
