= Harry Wolff (boxer) =

Swedish boxer

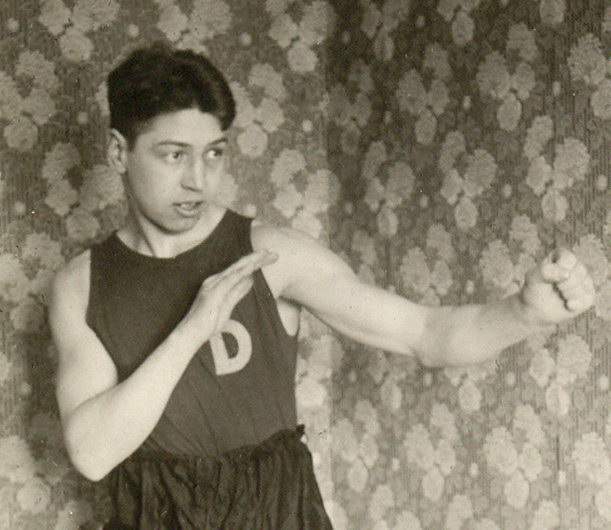
- Harry Wolff

Personal information
- Full name: Klas Harry Wolff
- Nationality: Sweden
- Born: 2 July 1905 Nyköping, Nyköping Municipality
- Died: 29 April 1987 (aged 81) Stockholm, Stockholm Municipality

Sport
- Sport: Boxing
- Weight class: Bantamweight
- Club: Djurgårdens IF, Stockholm
Medal record
Men's amateur boxing
Representing Sweden
European Amateur Championships
Silver medal – second place	1927 Berlin	Featherweight

Klas Harry Wolff (2 July 1905 – 29 April 1987) was a Swedish boxer who won a silver medal in the featherweight division at the 1927 European Championships. He competed at the 1924 Summer Olympics in bantamweight, but was eliminated in the second round by the eventual gold medalist William Smith of South Africa.

Wolff represented Djurgårdens IF.

== 1924 Olympic results ==
Below are the results of Harry Wolff, a Swedish bantamweight boxer who competed at the 1924 Paris Olympics:

- Round of 32: bye
- Round of 16: lost to William H. Smith (South Africa) by decision
