= Djurgårdens IF Boxningsförening =

Swedish boxing club

The logo of Djurgårdens IF.

Djurgårdens IF Boxningsförening is the section for boxing within the Swedish sports club Djurgårdens IF in Stockholm. Djurgårdens IF is one of Sweden's oldest boxing clubs. The section was formally founded in 1917, but members in the main club had been boxing many years before this. The club has won many Swedish championships in different weight classes.

== Famous boxers in Djurgårdens IF ==
- Nils Ramm, silver medal, heavyweight, 1928 Summer Olympics in Amsterdam
- Olle Tandberg, European amateur boxing champion 1937–1939
- George Scott, silver medal, lightweight, 1988 Summer Olympics in Seoul and as a pro he was world champion (WBU) 1995–1997
- Lars Myrberg, bronze medal, light welterweight, 1988 Summer Olympics in Seoul
- Badou Jack, world champion (WBC) in super middleweight 2015–

== Honours ==
Swedish Champions

- 1920 David Lindén (Light heavyweight)
- 1921 Oskar Kjällander (Lightweight)
- 1922 Evert Karlsson (Flyweight)
- 1922 Gustaf Bergman (Lightweight)
- 1922 David Lindén (Light heavyweight)
- 1923 Oscar Andrén (Featherweight)
- 1923 Gustaf Bergman (Lightweight)
- 1924 Harry Wolff (Bantamweight)
- 1925 Oscar Andrén (Featherweight)
- 1926 Oskar Kjällander (Welterweight)
- 1926 Nils Ramm (Light heavyweight)
- 1926 Gustaf Magnusson (Cruiserweight)
- 1927 John Pihl (Flyweight)
- 1927 Harry Wolff (Featherweight)
- 1927 Nils Ramm (Light heavyweight)
- 1927 Gustaf Andersson (Cruiserweight)
- 1928 John Pihl (Flyweight)
- 1928 Gustaf Andersson (Cruiserweight)
- 1929 Arthur Litzén (Welterweight)
- 1929 John Andersson (Middleweight)
- 1930 Gustaf Eriksson (Light heavyweight)
- 1931 Kurt Liljedahl (Featherweight)
- 1931 John Andersson (Light heavyweight)
- 1936 Einar Hammar (Welterweight)
- 1936 Olle Tandberg (Cruiserweight)
- 1937 Olle Tandberg (Cruiserweight)
- 1938 Olle Tandberg (Cruiserweight)
- 1939 Harry Ljushammar (Bantamweight)
- 1939 Einar Hammar (Middleweight)
- 1939 Olle Tandberg (Cruiserweight)
- 1940 Einar Hammar (Middleweight)
- 1940 Olle Tandberg (Cruiserweight)
- 1941 Einar Hammar (Middleweight)
- 1942 Bo Below (Light heavyweight)
- 1949 Bengt Modigh (Cruiserweight)
- 1950 Bertil Ahlin (Featherweight)
- 1951 Bertil Ahlin (Featherweight)
- 1952 Roy Swedberg (Bantamweight)
- 1953 Roy Swedberg (Bantamweight)
- 1953 Bertil Ahlin (Lightweight)
- 1958 Roger Höglund (Lightweight)
- 1958 Nils Olsson (Lätt Middleweight)
- 1961 Ove Larsson (Lightweight)
- 1963 Hans Pincoffs (Flyweight)
- 1963 Ove Ljungkvist (Super lightweight)
- 1963 Teofil Pollex (Middleweight)
- 1964 Hans Pincoffs (Flyweight)
- 1964 Teofil Pollex (Middleweight)
- 1965 Hans Pincoffs (Bantamweight)
- 1968 Bo Grebbert (Featherweight)
- 1969 Carl-Axel Palm (Featherweight)
- 1970 Carl-Axel Palm (Featherweight)
- 1971 Carl-Axel Palm (Lightweight)
- 1971 Christer Cornbäck (Middleweight)
- 1972 Carl-Axel Palm (Super lightweight)
- 1980 Kalervo Alanenpää (Lightweight)
- 1981 Ari Alanenpää (Flyweight)
- 1986 Lars Lundgren (Super lightweight)
- 1986 Tommy Börzsei (Cruiserweight)
- 1987 Lars Myrberg (Welterweight)
- 1987 Larry Moritz (Cruiserweight)
- 1988 Lars Myrberg (Super lightweight)
- 1990 Hamayak Shabazian (Cruiserweight)
- 1991 George Scott (Lightweight)
- 1992 Zoltan Sarossy (Lightweight)
- 2002 Majid Jelili (Featherweight)
- 2003 Majid Jelili (Featherweight)
- 2006 Bashir Hassan (Featherweight)
- 2006 Naim Terbunja (Welterweight)
- 2006 Badou Jack (Middleweight)
- 2006 Steven Musisi (Light heavyweight)
- 2006 Modo Sallah (Heavyweight)
- 2007 Bashir Hassan (Featherweight)
- 2007 Naim Terbunja (Middleweight)
- 2008 Ruslan Saliev (Light flyweight)
- 2008 Bashir Hassan (Featherweight)
- 2008 Joanna Ekedahl (Welterweight)
- 2008 Badou Jack (Middleweight)
- 2008 Naim Terbunja (Light heavyweight)
- 2009 Ruslan Saliev (Light flyweight)
- 2009 Bashir Hassan (Featherweight)
- 2010 Bashir Hassan (Featherweight)
- 2010 Babacar Kamara (Light heavyweight)
- 2010 Modo Sallah (Heavyweight)
- 2011 Linnéa Strandell (Featherweight)
- 2011 Babacar Kamara (Light heavyweight)
- 2011 Modo Sallah (Heavyweight)
- 2012 Linnéa Strandell (Featherweight)
- 2012 Babacar Kamara (Cruiserweight)
- 2013 Linnea Strandell (Featherweight)
- 2013 Bashir Hassan (Lightweight)
- 2013 Gabriel Richards (Cruiserweight)
- 2013 Modo Sallah (Heavyweight)
- 2014 Bashir Hassan (Welterweight)
- 2014 Gabriel Richards (Cruiserweight)
- 2014 Modoh Sallah (Heavyweight)
