= José Pastor (boxer) =

Spanish boxer

José Pastor Catalán (14 February 1906 – 14 January 1996) was a Spanish boxer who competed in the 1924 Summer Olympics. He was eliminated in the second round of the bantamweight class after losing his fight to Jacques Lemouton.
