= Kaarlo Väkevä =

Finnish boxer

Kaarlo Olavi Väkevä (2 March 1909 – 27 March 1932) was a Finnish boxer who competed in the 1928 Summer Olympics.

He was born in Jakobstad and died in Aalborg, Denmark.

In 1928, he was eliminated in the quarterfinals of the featherweight class after losing to the eventual bronze medalist Harold Devine.

Winning a bronze medal at the 1930 European Amateur Boxing Championships, he became the first Finn to do so.

== 1928 Olympic results ==
Below is the record of Kaarlo Väkevä, a Finnish featherweight boxer who competed at the 1928 Amsterdam Olympics:

- Round of 32: bye
- Round of 16: defeated Raul Talan (Mexico) on points
- Quarterfinal: lost to Harold Devine (United States) on points
