= Carlos Abarca =

Chilean boxer (1900–1944)

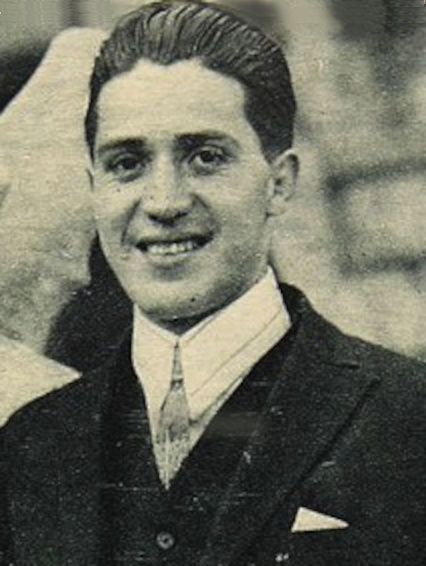
- Abarca in 1924
- Born: Carlos Enrique Abarca González; 22 May 1900; Santiago, Chile
- Died: 17 June 1944 (aged 44); Oaxaca, Mexico
- Occupation: boxer
- Known for: boxing

Carlos Abarca González (22 May 1900 – 17 June 1944) was a Chilean boxer who competed in the 1924 Summer Olympics. In the 1924 Olympic tournament Abarca was eliminated in the quarter-finals of the featherweight class after losing his fight to the eventual gold medalist Jackie Fields of the United States.

== 1924 Olympic results ==
Below are the results of Carlos Abarca, a Chilean featherweight boxer who competed at the 1924 Paris Olympics:

- Round of 32: defeated Gustaf Bergman (Sweden) by decision
- Round of 16: defeated Emilio Bautista (Spain) by decision
- Quarterfinal: lost to Jackie Fields (United States) by decision
