= Alf Barber =

British boxer

Mr. Albert "Alf" Oliver Barber (15 January 1902 – 4 April 1967) was a British boxer who competed in the 1924 Summer Olympics. In 1924, he was the first one who was eliminated in the quarter-finals of the bantamweight class after losing his fight to the upcoming bronze medalist Jean Ces.
