= Emilio Bautista =

Spanish boxer

Emilio Bautista Cachaza (4 February 1898 in Madrid – 2 January 1977) was a Spanish boxer who competed in the 1924 Summer Olympics. In 1924 he was eliminated in the second round of the featherweight class after losing his fight to Carlos Abarca of Chile.
