= Harold Devine =

American boxer

- Devine in retirement

Personal information
- Born: May 18, 1909 New Haven, Connecticut
- Died: April 29, 1998 (aged 88) North Oxford, Massachusetts
- Spouse: Mary Etta Goldberg
Medal record
Men's boxing
Representing the United States
Olympic Games
Bronze medal – third place	1928 Amsterdam	Featherweight

Harold "Harry" George Devine (May 18, 1909 – April 29, 1998) was an American boxing manager, trainer, judge, and competitor who won a bronze medal in the 1928 Summer Olympics in Amsterdam.

He was born in New Haven, Connecticut but spent the great majority of his life in Worcester, Massachusetts.

== Amateur career highlights ==
Devine began boxing around fourteen in his hometown of Worcester, and found great success by nineteen, when in 1928 he became national AAU featherweight champion and was chosen to represent the United States in the 1928 Olympics in Amsterdam. There he defeated Fausto Montefiori of Italy in the Second Round. His local paper, the Telegram wrote, Devine "emerged from the heated skirmish perfectly unscathed, despite the Italian’s two attempts to butt him." General Douglas MacArthur cheered Devine on from ringside.

Devine proceeded to defeat Kaarlo Vakeva of Finland in the Third. In the Semi-Finals on August 10, he was beaten by Dutch boxer Bep van Klaveren despite flooring the soon to be gold medal winner in the second round. Showing great resolve despite suffering from a broken knuckle, Devine took the featherweight bronze medal after winning the final round for third place with a decision against Lucian Biquet of Belgium.

After the Olympics, he married home-town girl Mary Etta Goldberg, who was three years his junior.

== 1928 Olympic results ==
Devine's record at the 1928 Amsterdam Olympics follows:

- Round of 32: bye
- Round of 16: defeated Fausto Montefiore (Italy) on points
- Quarterfinal: defeated Kaarlo Vakeva (Finland) on points
- Semifinal: lost to Bep van Klaveren (Netherlands) on points
- Bronze Medal Bout: defeated Lucian Biquet (Belgium) on points (was awarded bronze medal)

== Pro career ==
=== New England welterweight title ===
As a professional, Devine was handicapped as a southpaw who was often avoided by other good fighters. Hand injuries held him back and he lost twice on cut eyes. Nevertheless, he won the New England welterweight title in 1934 by defeating Werther Arcelli in Worcester in April, then defended it successfully against Pancho Villa of New Bedford, Massachusetts in June, before losing it to the exceptional Frankie Britt in February 1935.

In 1935 he went to Australia, where he suffered two severe setbacks that summer and then retired from the ring after around 60 professional fights. He served as a private in the Army during WWII.

== Retirement ==
After retiring from competitive boxing, Devine gave back to his sport as a manager, trainer and boxing judge. While managing boxers, Devine's best known boxer was Don Williams in the 1950s, and he continued to manage and train boxers into the 1970s. Remaining in his hometown of Worcester, Massachusetts, where he worked as a furrier by trade, he retired from Furs by Michael in 1994. He took up golf in his retirement. He died in April 1998 and was buried at B'nai Brith Lodge Cemetery in Worcester where he spent nearly 50 years.
