= Benjamín Pertuzzo =

Argentine boxer

Benjamín "Benito" Pertuzzo (born 2 March 1905, date of death unknown) was an Argentine boxer who competed in the 1924 Summer Olympics. In 1924 he was eliminated in the quarter-finals of the bantamweight class after losing his fight to the upcoming silver medalist Salvatore Tripoli.
