= Jean Boireau =

French boxer

Personal information
- Nationality: French
- Born: 12 February 1909
- Died: 20 February 1983 (aged 74)

Sport
- Sport: Boxing

Jean Boireau (12 February 1909 – 20 February 1983) was a French boxer. He competed in the men's featherweight event at the 1928 Summer Olympics.
