= Idrissa Dione =

French boxer (born 1929)

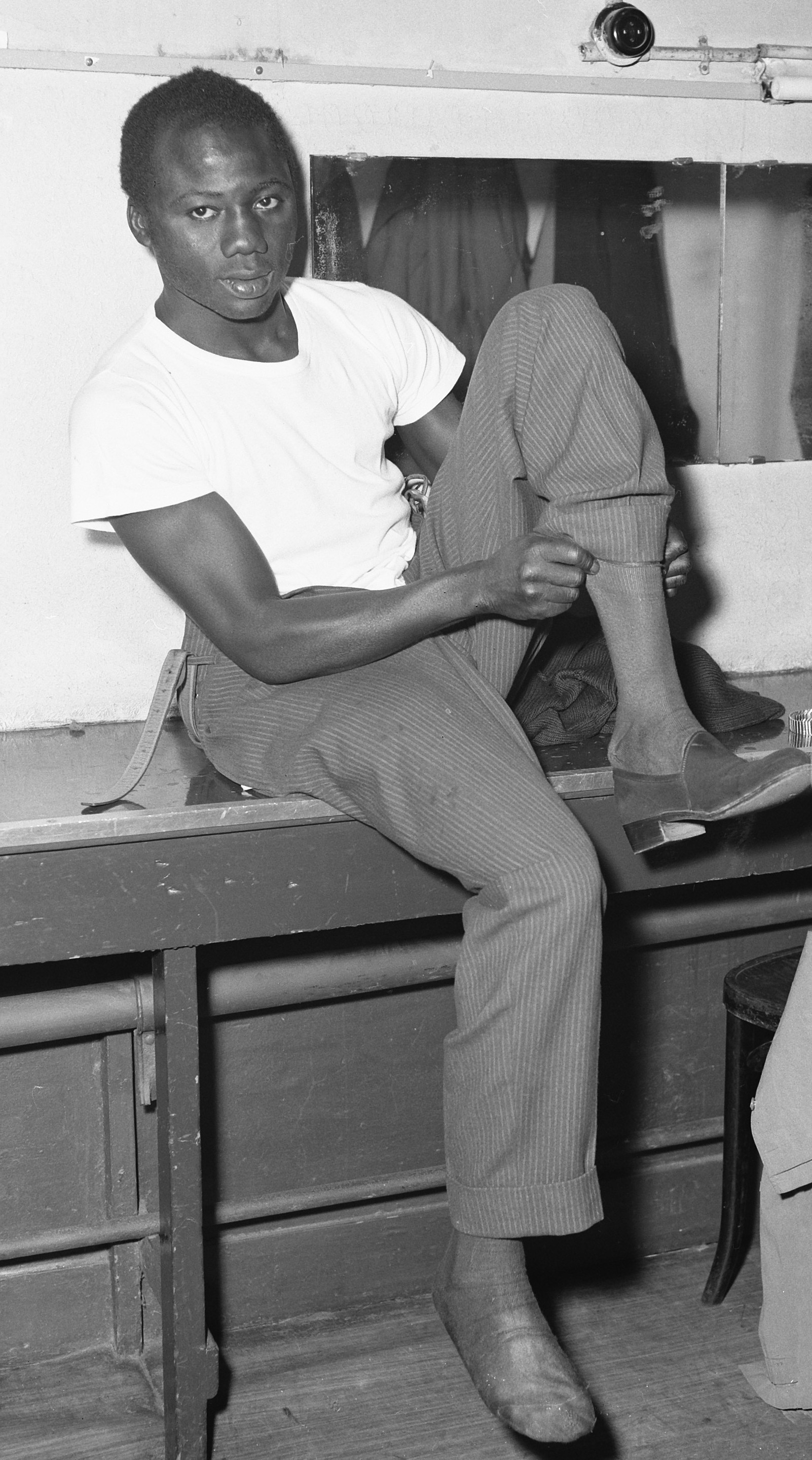
- Idrissa Dione in 1955

Personal information
- Nationality: (France) French
- Born: 21 July 1929 (age 97) Brazzaville, Congo
- Weight: Welterweight

Boxing career
- Stance: Orthodox

Boxing record
- Total fights: 71
- Wins: 52
- Win by KO: 13
- Losses: 15
- Draws: 4

Idrissa Dione (born 21 July 1929) is a retired French boxer who was active between 1951 and 1958. In 1955 Dione won the European Boxing Union welterweight title and defended it once before losing it to Emilio Marconi in 1956. He retired in April 1958 due to eye problems.
