= Fred Perry (boxer) =

British boxer

Personal information
- Nationality: British
- Born: 2 January 1904; Cardiff, Wales
- Died: 11 January 1981 (aged 77); Cardiff, Wales

Sport
- Sport: Boxing

Fred Perry (2 January 1904 – 11 January 1981) was a British boxer. He competed in the men's featherweight event at the 1928 Summer Olympics.
