= Bep van Klaveren =

Dutch boxer (1907–1992)

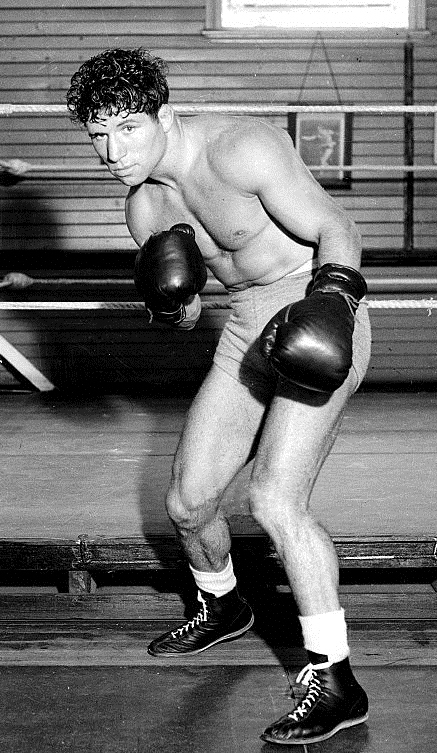
- Bep van Klaveren in Australia in 1935

Personal information
- Full name: Lambertus van Klaveren
- Nickname: The Dutch Windmill
- Nationality: Netherlands
- Born: 26 September 1907 Rotterdam, the Netherlands
- Died: 12 February 1992 (aged 84) Rotterdam, the Netherlands
- Height: 1.73 m (5 ft 8 in)
- Weight: 57 kg (126 lb)

Sport
- Sport: Boxing
- Weight class: Featherweight
- Club: Schilperoord, Rotterdam
Medal record
Representing the Netherlands
Olympic Games
Gold medal – first place	1928 Amsterdam	Featherweight

Lambertus "Bep" van Klaveren (26 September 1907 – 12 February 1992) was a Dutch boxer, who won the gold medal in the featherweight division at the 1928 Summer Olympics in Amsterdam. Van Klaveren remains the only Dutch boxer to have won an Olympic gold medal. His younger brother Piet competed as a boxer at the 1952 Summer Olympics.

== Biography ==
Born in Rotterdam as Lambertus Steenhorst, he adopted the name of his stepfather Pieter van Klaveren when he was eight. After primary school, he worked as a butcher's assistant and fought in his spare time. He seriously took up boxing aged 16, and around that time changed to a vegetarian diet believing it fits better for a boxer. In 1926 he won the national flyweight title and in 1927–29 the featherweight title. After his Olympic success in 1928, he received a hero's welcome in his hometown Rotterdam and was presented to the Dutch Queen and her prince consort.

In 1929 van Klaveren began a long career of professional boxer, which ended in 1956. In 1931 he became European champion in the lightweight division and in 1938 he won the same title in the middleweight division. During his professional tenure, van Klaveren fought on four continents and won fights against Ceferino Garcia and Kid Azteca. He also faced Hall of Famers Young Corbett III and Billy Petrolle.

In 1935 van Klaveren married Margarite Olivera, daughter of a banker. He lost much money through her excessive lifestyle and through his boxing manager. Van Klaveren was sentenced for one year for assaulting Olivera. He was released on bail after three months and fled to Rotterdam, leaving behind all his possessions.

During World War II van Klaveren served overseas with the Dutch army. He then moved to Australia with his second wife, an Australian nurse, and worked there as a sports teacher, dock worker, bouncer, and boxing instructor. He then returned to Rotterdam and retired in 1948, but returned to the ring in 1954 and won 11 out of 12 bouts. He retired for good in 1956 after an unsuccessful attempt to win the European welterweight title. The same year he married for the third time, and for several years ran a cigar shop with his wife, though with little success. He continued to train through all his life and did not smoke or drink alcohol. He died in 1992 in his native Rotterdam, aged 84. The same year a memorial statue of van Klaveren was installed in Rotterdam. The annual Bep van Klaveren boxing memorial was launched in 1993, and became the largest boxing competition in the Netherlands.

== Gallery ==
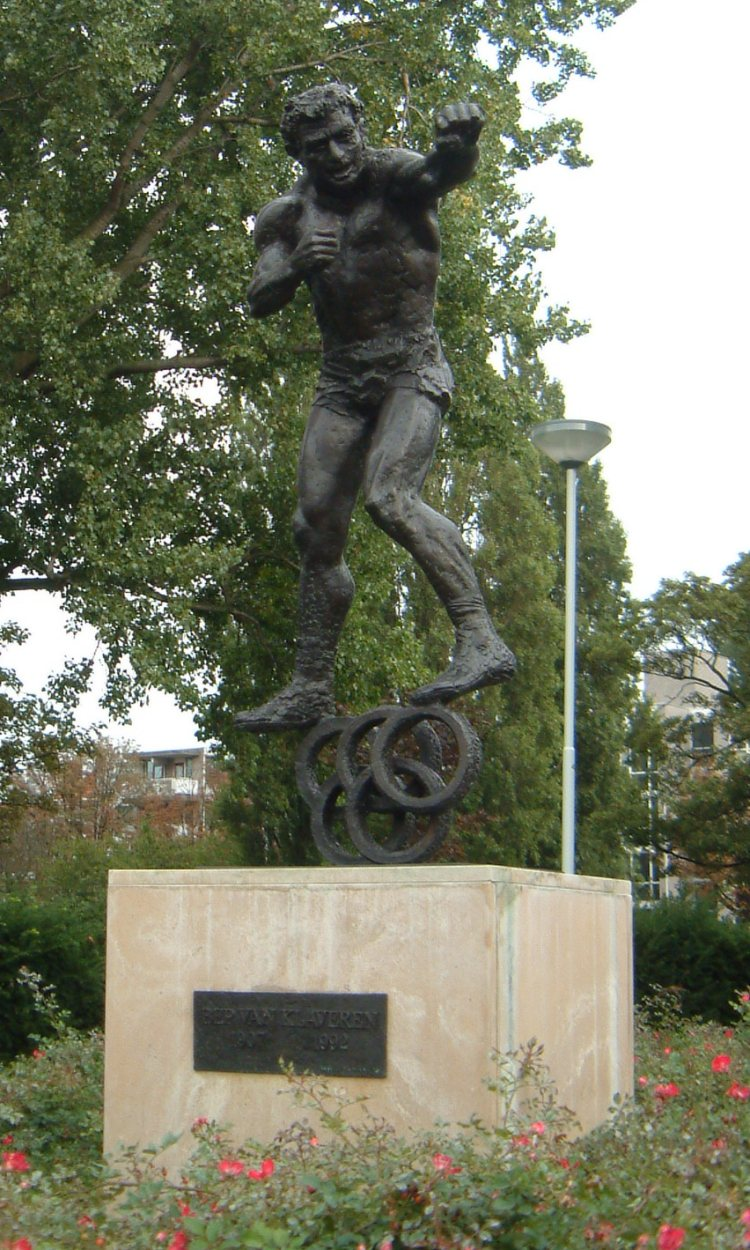
The statue of Bep van Klaveren in Rotterdam

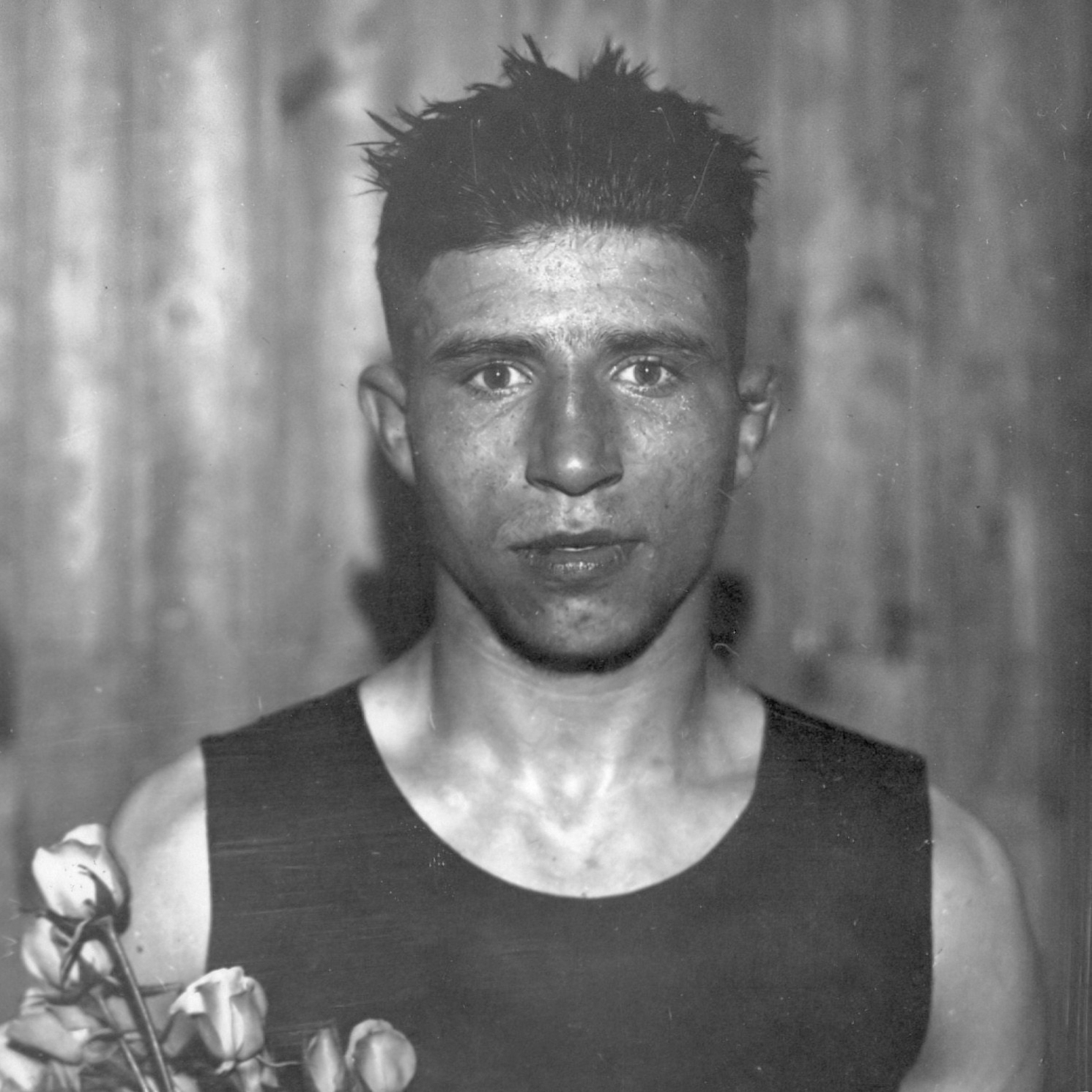
Bep van Klaveren 1928

1932 match against Cleto Locatelli

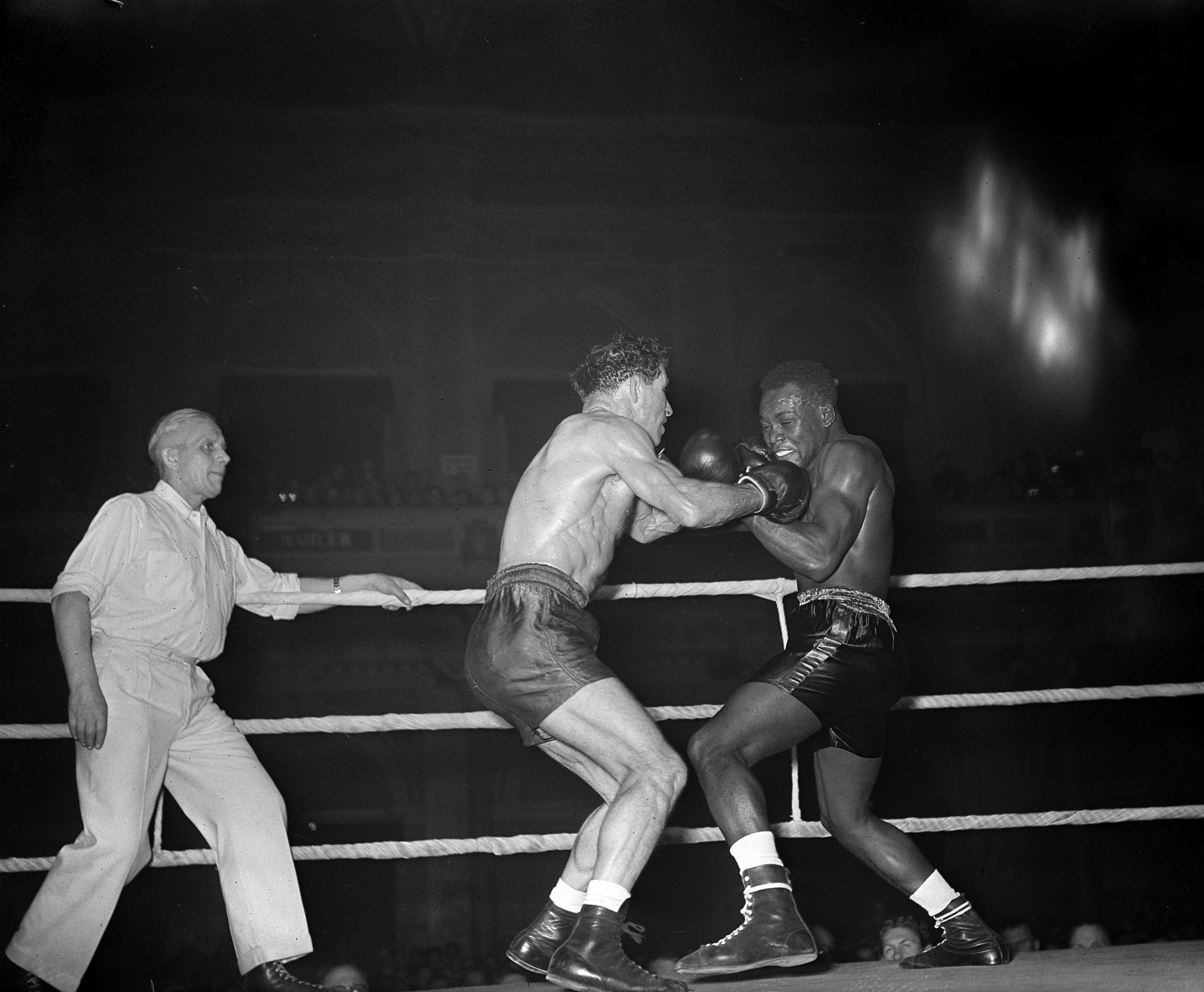
Bep van Klaveren vs Kid Pompeij in Amsterdam, 15 February 1954

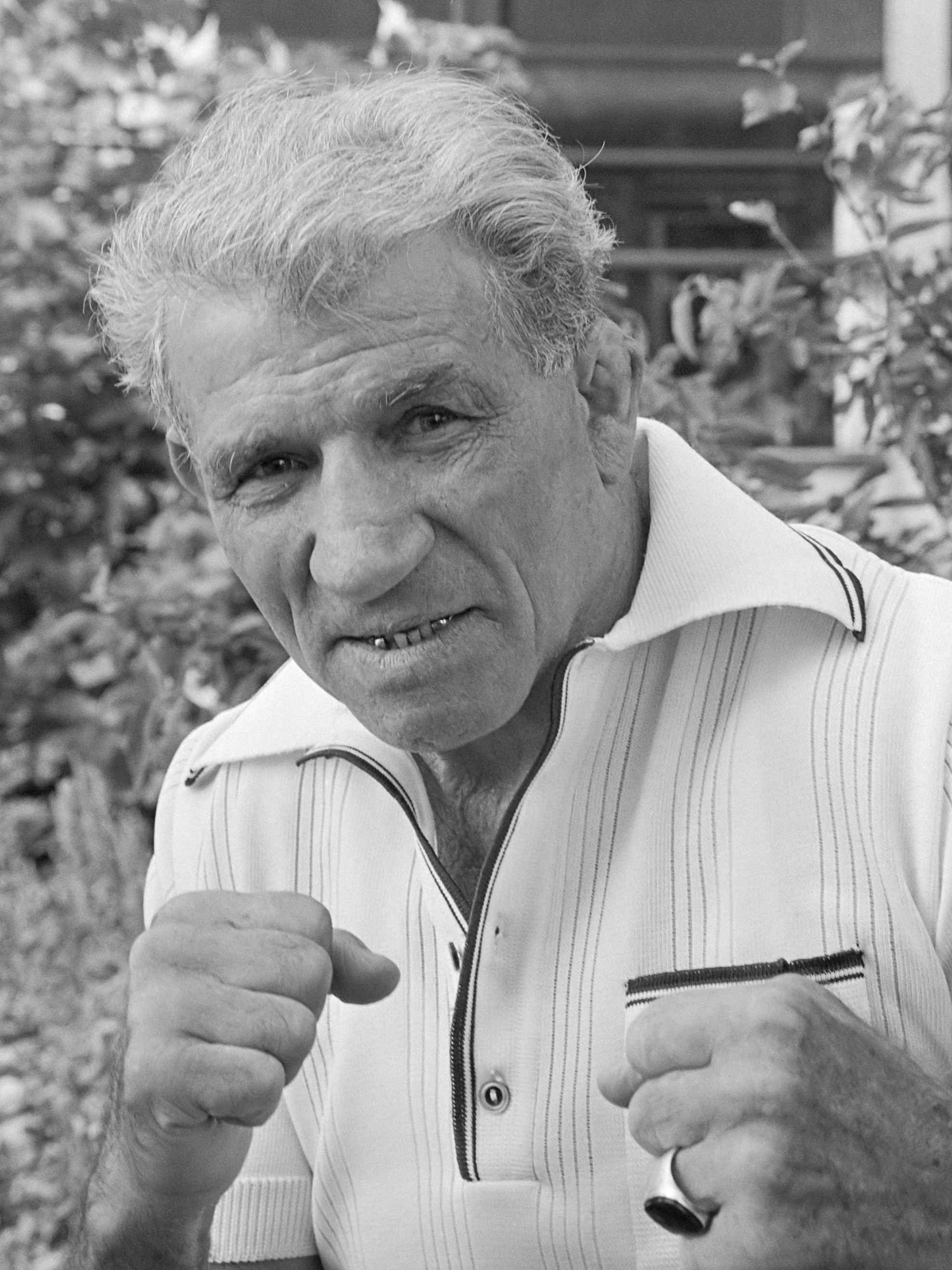
Bep van Klaveren 1982

== Professional boxing record ==
110 fights	80 wins	21 losses
By knockout	21	4
By decision	59	15
By disqualification	0	2
Draws	9	

No.	Result	Record	Opponent	Type	Round, time	Date	Age	Location	Notes
110	Loss	80–21–9	Werner Handtke	TKO	5 (10)	Mar 19, 1956	48 years, 172 days	Ahoy'-hal, Rotterdam, Netherlands	
109	Loss	80–20–9	Idrissa Dione	PTS	15	Nov 28, 1955	48 years, 60 days	Ahoy'-hal, Rotterdam, Netherlands	For European welterweight title
108	Win	80–19–9	Horst Garz	PTS	10	Sep 26, 1955	47 years, 362 days	Rivièrahal, Rotterdam, Netherlands	
107	Win	79–19–9	Freddi Teichmann	PTS	10	May 16, 1955	47 years, 229 days	Kurzaal, Scheveningen, Netherlands	
106	Win	78–19–9	Emil Koch	PTS	10	Mar 21, 1955	47 years, 173 days	Rivièrahal, Rotterdam, Netherlands	
105	Win	77–19–9	Rafael da Silva	PTS	10	Jan 17, 1955	47 years, 110 days	Ahoy'-hal, Rotterdam, Netherlands	
104	Win	76–19–9	Terry Ratcliffe	TKO	8 (10)	Nov 1, 1954	47 years, 33 days	Ahoy'-hal, Rotterdam, Netherlands	
103	Win	75–19–9	Jimmy Lyggett	PTS	10	Oct 4, 1954	47 years, 5 days	Haagsche Zoo, Den Haag, Netherlands	
102	Loss	74–19–9	Terry Ratcliffe	TKO	4 (10)	Sep 6, 1954	46 years, 342 days	Ahoy'-hal, Rotterdam, Netherlands	
101	Win	74–18–9	Herbert Glaser	KO	2 (10)	Jun 21, 1954	46 years, 265 days	Ahoy'-hal, Rotterdam, Netherlands	
100	Win	73–18–9	Santos Martins	PTS	10	May 21, 1954	46 years, 234 days	Kurzaal, Scheveningen, Netherlands	
99	Win	72–18–9	Alois Dewulf	PTS	10	Apr 15, 1954	46 years, 198 days	Haagsche Zoo, Den Haag, Netherlands	
98	Win	71–18–9	Kit Pompey	PTS	10	Feb 15, 1954	46 years, 139 days	Concertgebouw, Amsterdam, Netherlands	
97	Win	70–18–9	Tino Pierluigi	PTS	8	Jan 7, 1954	46 years, 100 days	Rivièrahal, Rotterdam, Netherlands	
96	Win	69–18–9	Francois Blanchard	TD	6 (10)	Nov 30, 1948	41 years, 62 days	RAI, Amsterdam, Netherlands	The bout was halted after round 6 because of a cut over Blanchard's right eye
95	Win	68–18–9	Jean Wanes	PTS	10	Nov 16, 1948	41 years, 48 days	Rivièrahal, Rotterdam, Netherlands	
94	Win	67–18–9	Albert Heyen	TKO	1 (10)	Nov 2, 1948	41 years, 34 days	Rubenspaleis, Antwerpen, Belgium	
93	Win	66–18–9	Hans Norbert	KO	3 (10)	Jul 28, 1948	40 years, 303 days	RAI, Amsterdam, Netherlands	
92	Win	65–18–9	Harry Bos	TKO	5 (10)	Jul 15, 1948	40 years, 290 days	Apollohal, Amsterdam, Netherlands	
91	Win	64–18–9	Harry Bos	TKO	4 (10)	Jun 22, 1948	40 years, 267 days	Apollohal, Amsterdam, Netherlands	
90	Loss	63–18–9	Luc van Dam	PTS	15	May 15, 1948	40 years, 229 days	Apollohal, Amsterdam, Netherlands	For Dutch middleweight title
89	Win	63–17–9	Leon Fouquet	PTS	10	Apr 21, 1948	40 years, 205 days	Rivièrahal, Rotterdam, Netherlands	
88	Win	62–17–9	Des Jones	PTS	10	Apr 6, 1948	40 years, 190 days	Apollohal, Amsterdam, Netherlands	
87	Loss	61–17–9	Luc van Dam	TD	9 (12)	Sep 5, 1947	39 years, 341 days	Olympisch Stadion, Amsterdam, Netherlands	Lost Dutch middleweight title; The referee halted the fight because of a cut on Van Kleveren's cheek
86	Win	61–16–9	Luc van Dam	TD	5 (15)	Aug 10, 1947	39 years, 315 days	Stadion Feijenoord, Rotterdam, Netherlands	Won Dutch middleweight title; The referee halted the fight because of a cut on Van Dam's cheek
85	Win	60–16–9	George Posno	TKO	5 (10)	May 13, 1947	39 years, 226 days	Rivièrahal, Rotterdam, Netherlands	
84	Win	59–16–9	Jan Schoen	KO	4 (10)	Apr 15, 1947	39 years, 198 days	Hotel Krasnapolsky, Amsterdam, Netherlands	
83	Draw	58–16–9	Paul Altman	PTS	6	Sep 15, 1942	34 years, 351 days	Olympic Auditorium, Los Angeles, California, US	
82	Win	58–16–8	Mickey Daniels	PTS	10	Sep 19, 1941	33 years, 355 days	Civic Auditorium, San Francisco, California, US	
81	Loss	57–16–8	Milt Aaron	UD	10	Mar 14, 1940	32 years, 167 days	Coliseum, Chicago, Illinois, US	
80	Draw	57–15–8	Augie Arellano	PTS	8	Feb 24, 1940	32 years, 148 days	Ridgewood Grove, New York City, New York, US	
79	Win	57–15–7	Jay Macedon	PTS	8	Jan 27, 1940	32 years, 120 days	Ridgewood Grove, New York City, New York, US	
78	Win	56–15–7	Ernie Vigh	PTS	8	Jan 9, 1940	32 years, 102 days	New York Coliseum, New York City, New York, US	
77	Win	55–15–7	Cleto Locatelli	PTS	10	Jul 24, 1939	31 years, 298 days	Doelentuin, Rotterdam, Netherlands	
76	Win	54–15–7	Assane Diouf	PTS	10	Jun 25, 1939	31 years, 269 days	Stadion Feijenoord, Rotterdam, Netherlands	
75	Win	53–15–7	Al Baker	PTS	10	May 14, 1939	31 years, 227 days	Doelentuin, Rotterdam, Netherlands	
74	Win	52–15–7	Victor Janas	PTS	10	Apr 3, 1939	31 years, 186 days	De Doelen, Rotterdam, Netherlands	
73	Draw	51–15–7	Jupp Besselmann	PTS	12	Mar 9, 1939	31 years, 161 days	Sportpalast Schoeneberg, Germany	
72	Win	51–15–6	Paddy Roche	PTS	10	Feb 13, 1939	31 years, 137 days	De Doelen, Rotterdam, Netherlands	
71	Loss	50–15–6	Anton Christoforidis	PTS	15	Nov 14, 1938	31 years, 46 days	De Doelen, Rotterdam, Netherlands	Lost European middleweight title
70	Win	50–14–6	Henry Rothier	PTS	10	Oct 17, 1938	31 years, 18 days	De Doelen, Rotterdam, Netherlands	
69	Win	49–14–6	Edouard Tenet	PTS	15	Jul 17, 1938	30 years, 291 days	Stadion Feijenoord, Rotterdam, Netherlands	Won European middleweight title
68	Win	48–14–6	Anton Christoforidis	PTS	10	May 23, 1938	30 years, 236 days	Nenijtohal, Rotterdam, Netherlands	
67	Win	47–14–6	Jean Simon	PTS	10	Mar 21, 1938	30 years, 173 days	De Doelen, Rotterdam, Netherlands	
66	Win	46–14–6	Kid Tunero	PTS	10	Feb 7, 1938	30 years, 131 days	Nenijtohal, Rotterdam, Netherlands	
65	Win	45–14–6	Pierre Stepanci	PTS	10	Jan 10, 1938	30 years, 103 days	De Doelen, Rotterdam, Netherlands	
64	Win	44–14–6	Jack Ulrich	RTD	3 (10)	Dec 10, 1937	30 years, 72 days	Hotel Krasnapolsky, Amsterdam, Netherlands	
63	Win	43–14–6	Nestor Charlier	PTS	10	Nov 8, 1937	30 years, 40 days	De Doelen, Rotterdam, Netherlands	
62	Win	42–14–6	Gilbert Jamsin	TKO	4 (10)	Oct 11, 1937	30 years, 12 days	Hotel Krasnapolsky, Amsterdam, Netherlands	
61	Loss	41–14–6	Gustav Eder	KO	8 (10)	Jul 11, 1937	29 years, 285 days	Nenijtohal, Rotterdam, Netherlands	
60	Win	41–13–6	Jomme Wegner	TKO	6 (10)	May 10, 1937	29 years, 223 days	De Doelen, Rotterdam, Netherlands	
59	Win	40–13–6	Charles Pernot	PTS	10	Feb 8, 1937	29 years, 132 days	Nenijtohal, Rotterdam, Netherlands	
58	Loss	39–13–6	Glen Lee	PTS	10	Nov 6, 1936	29 years, 38 days	Legion Stadium, Hollywood, California, US	
57	Loss	39–12–6	Jack Carroll	PTS	15	Feb 6, 1936	28 years, 130 days	Sydney Sports Ground, Sydney, Australia	
56	Loss	39–11–6	Jack Carroll	PTS	15	Dec 26, 1935	28 years, 88 days	Sydney Sports Ground, Sydney, Australia	
55	Draw	39–10–6	Al Manfredo	PTS	10	Jul 12, 1935	27 years, 286 days	Frank Chance Field, Fresno, California, US	
54	Win	39–10–5	Kid Azteca	PTS	10	May 24, 1935	27 years, 237 days	Legion Stadium, Hollywood, California, US	
53	Win	38–10–5	Carlos Salomon	PTS	10	Apr 9, 1935	27 years, 192 days	Olympic Auditorium, Los Angeles, California, US	
52	Loss	37–10–5	Young Corbett III	PTS	10	Feb 22, 1935	27 years, 146 days	Kezar Stadium, San Francisco, California, US	
51	Loss	37–9–5	Young Corbett III	PTS	10	Jan 28, 1935	27 years, 121 days	Civic Auditorium, San Francisco, California, US	
50	Win	37–8–5	Ceferino Garcia	PTS	10	Dec 7, 1934	27 years, 69 days	Legion Stadium, Hollywood, California, US	
49	Loss	36–8–5	Ceferino Garcia	PTS	10	Oct 30, 1934	27 years, 31 days	Olympic Auditorium, Los Angeles, California, US	
48	Draw	36–7–5	Joe Rossi	PTS	10	May 9, 1934	26 years, 222 days	Broadway Arena, New York City, New York, US	
47	Win	36–7–4	Eddie Shapiro	TKO	7 (10)	Apr 30, 1934	26 years, 213 days	Carlin's Park, Baltimore, Maryland, US	
46	Win	35–7–4	Frankie Petrolle	PTS	10	Mar 16, 1934	26 years, 168 days	104th Regiment Armory, Baltimore, Maryland, US	
45	Win	34–7–4	Phil Rafferty	PTS	10	Jan 25, 1934	26 years, 118 days	Broadway Arena, New York City, New York, US	
44	Win	33–7–4	Benny Levine	KO	3 (10)	Jan 13, 1934	26 years, 106 days	Ridgewood Grove, New York City, New York, US	
43	Win	32–7–4	Tony Falco	PTS	10	Jan 5, 1934	26 years, 98 days	Broadway Arena, New York City, New York, US	
42	Win	31–7–4	Stanislaus Loayza	PTS	10	Nov 16, 1933	26 years, 48 days	Broadway Arena, New York City, New York, US	
41	Loss	30–7–4	Billy Petrolle	RTD	4 (10)	Jul 12, 1933	25 years, 286 days	Polo Grounds, New York City, New York, US	
40	Win	30–6–4	Herman Perlick	PTS	10	Jun 5, 1933	25 years, 249 days	Bonacker's Stadium, Rensselaer, New York, US	
39	Win	29–6–4	Jimmy Phillips	PTS	8	Mar 31, 1933	25 years, 183 days	Madison Square Garden, New York City, New York, US	
38	Win	28–6–4	Baby Joe Gans	PTS	8	Mar 17, 1933	25 years, 169 days	Madison Square Garden, New York City, New York, US	
37	Win	27–6–4	Phil Rafferty	PTS	10	Jan 9, 1933	25 years, 102 days	St. Nicholas Arena, New York City, New York, US	
36	Win	26–6–4	Eddie Ran	PTS	10	Nov 28, 1932	25 years, 60 days	St. Nicholas Arena, New York City, New York, US	
35	Win	25–6–4	Paolo Villa	PTS	8	Nov 21, 1932	25 years, 53 days	St. Nicholas Arena, New York City, New York, US	
34	Loss	24–6–4	Cleto Locatelli	PTS	15	Jul 17, 1932	24 years, 292 days	Wielerbaan Kralingen, Rotterdam, Netherlands	Lost European lightweight title
33	Win	24–5–4	Victor Deckmyn	TKO	5 (10)	Jun 5, 1932	24 years, 250 days	Wielerbaan Kralingen, Rotterdam, Netherlands	
32	Win	23–5–4	Len Tiger Smith	PTS	10	May 2, 1932	24 years, 216 days	Gebouw van K&W, Rotterdam, Netherlands	
31	Draw	22–5–4	François Sybille	SD	15	Mar 26, 1932	24 years, 179 days	Palais des Sports, Schaerbeek, Belgium	Retained European lightweight title
30	Loss	22–5–3	Louis Saerens	SD	10	Jan 5, 1932	24 years, 98 days	Rubenspaleis, Antwerpen, Belgium	
29	Win	22–4–3	Henri Scillie	TKO	4 (10)	Dec 16, 1931	24 years, 78 days	Palais des Sports, Schaerbeek, Belgium	
28	Win	21–4–3	Henri Scillie	SD	15	Nov 17, 1931	24 years, 49 days	Gebouw van K&W, Den Haag, Netherlands	Retained European lightweight title
27	Win	20–4–3	Harry Corbett	PTS	15	Oct 21, 1931	24 years, 22 days	Colston Hall, Bristol, England, UK	Retained European lightweight title
26	Win	19–4–3	Jim Hunter	KO	2 (15), 2:45	Oct 5, 1931	24 years, 6 days	Gebouw van K&W, Den Haag, Netherlands	
25	Win	18–4–3	François Sybille	KO	2 (15), 2:45	Jul 19, 1931	23 years, 293 days	Wielerbaan Kralingen, Rotterdam, Netherlands	Won European lightweight title
24	Draw	17–4–3	Leen Sanders	PTS	10	Apr 20, 1931	23 years, 203 days	Gebouw van K&W, Rotterdam, Netherlands	
23	Draw	17–4–2	Franz Dübbers	PTS	8	Feb 17, 1931	23 years, 141 days	Sportpalast, Schoeneberg, Berlin, Weimar Republic	
22	Win	17–4–1	Paul Czirson	KO	5 (10)	Feb 9, 1931	23 years, 133 days	Gebouw van K&W, Rotterdam, Netherlands	
21	Win	16–4–1	Jakob Domgoergen	PTS	10	Jan 8, 1931	23 years, 101 days	Haagsche Zoo, Den Haag, Netherlands	
20	Draw	15–4–1	Paul Czirson	PTS	10	Nov 7, 1930	23 years, 39 days	Etablissement Sagebiel, Hamburg, Weimar Republic	
19	Win	15–4	Henri Vuillamy	PTS	10	Nov 3, 1930	23 years, 35 days	Gebouw van K&W, Rotterdam, Netherlands	
18	Loss	14–4	Len Tiger Smith	PTS	12	Aug 2, 1930	22 years, 307 days	City Hall, Johannesburg, South Africa	
17	Win	14–3	George Purchase	PTS	10	Jul 5, 1930	22 years, 279 days	City Hall, Johannesburg, South Africa	
16	Win	13–3	Charles van Rooyen	PTS	10	Jun 14, 1930	22 years, 258 days	City Hall, Johannesburg, South Africa	
15	Win	12–3	Lucien Porthaels	PTS	10	May 7, 1930	22 years, 220 days	Haagsche Zoo, Den Haag, Netherlands	
14	Win	11–3	Charlie Mack	PTS	10	Apr 28, 1930	22 years, 211 days	Gebouw van K&W, Rotterdam, Netherlands	
13	Loss	10–3	Harry Brooks	PTS	15	Apr 1, 1930	22 years, 184 days	Free Trade Hall, Manchester, England, UK	
12	Win	10–2	Haydn Williams	PTS	10	Mar 17, 1930	22 years, 169 days	Haagsche Zoo, Den Haag, Netherlands	
11	Win	9–2	Leen Sanders	PTS	15	Feb 18, 1930	22 years, 142 days	Gebouw van K&W, Rotterdam, Netherlands	Won Dutch lightweight title
10	Win	8–2	Jack Hudson	TKO	11 (15)	Jan 28, 1930	22 years, 121 days	Free Trade Hall, Manchester, England, UK	
9	Win	7–2	Horace Barber	PTS	15	Jan 13, 1930	22 years, 106 days	Baths Hall, Swindon, England, UK	
8	Win	6–2	Billy Streets	PTS	15	Jan 8, 1930	22 years, 101 days	Connaught Drill Hall, Portsmouth, England, UK	
7	Win	5–2	Jack Dedheene	TKO	3 (10)	Dec 25, 1929	22 years, 87 days	Gebouw van K&W, Rotterdam, Netherlands	
6	Win	4–2	George Peck	PTS	15	Nov 30, 1929	22 years, 62 days	Holmeside Stadium, Sunderland, England, UK	
5	Win	3–2	Leo Nicolaas	TKO	7 (10)	Nov 18, 1929	22 years, 50 days	Haagsche Zoo, Den Haag, Netherlands	
4	Loss	2–2	Young Lefevre	DQ	8 (10)	Oct 30, 1929	22 years, 31 days	Gebouw van K&W, Rotterdam, Netherlands	Low blow
3	Win	2–1	Kid Robert	KO	4 (10)	Oct 14, 1929	22 years, 15 days	Haagsche Zoo, Den Haag, Netherlands	
2	Loss	1–1	Nicolas Wilk	DQ	4 (10)	Aug 26, 1929	21 years, 331 days	Gebouw van K&W, Rotterdam, Netherlands	Low blow
1	Win	1–0	Jules Steyaert	PTS	8	Jul 29, 1929	21 years, 303 days	Gebouw van K&W, Rotterdam, Netherlands	
