= Oscar Andrén =

Swedish boxer (1899–1981)

Personal information
- Full name: Oscar Fredrik Andrén
- Nationality: Swedish
- Born: 7 November 1899 Stockholm, Stockholm Municipality, Sweden
- Died: 11 September 1981 (aged 82) Stockholm, Stockholm Municipality, Sweden

Sport
- Sport: Boxing
- Weight class: Featherweight / Bantamweight
- Club: Djurgårdens IF, Stockholm
Medal record
Men's amateur boxing
Representing Sweden
European Amateur Championships
Gold medal – first place	1925 Stockholm	Featherweight
Swedish Championship
Gold medal – first place	1923	Featherweight
Gold medal – first place	1925	Featherweight

Oscar Fredrik Andrén (7 November 1899 – 11 September 1981) was a Swedish boxer who competed in the 1924 Summer Olympics. In 1924 he finished fourth in the bantamweight class after losing the bronze medal bout to Jean Ces.

Andrén represented Djurgårdens IF.
