= Lucian Biquet =

Belgian boxer

Luc Biquet
Personal information
- Full name: Lucian Biquet
- Nationality: Belgian
- Born: 2 October 1909 Liège, Belgium
- Died: 4 May 1973 (aged 63)

Sport
- Sport: Boxing

Luc Biquet (2 October 1909 – 4 May 1973) was a Belgian boxer. He competed in the men's featherweight event at the 1928 Summer Olympics.
