= William Alexander Smith (boxer) =

South African boxer

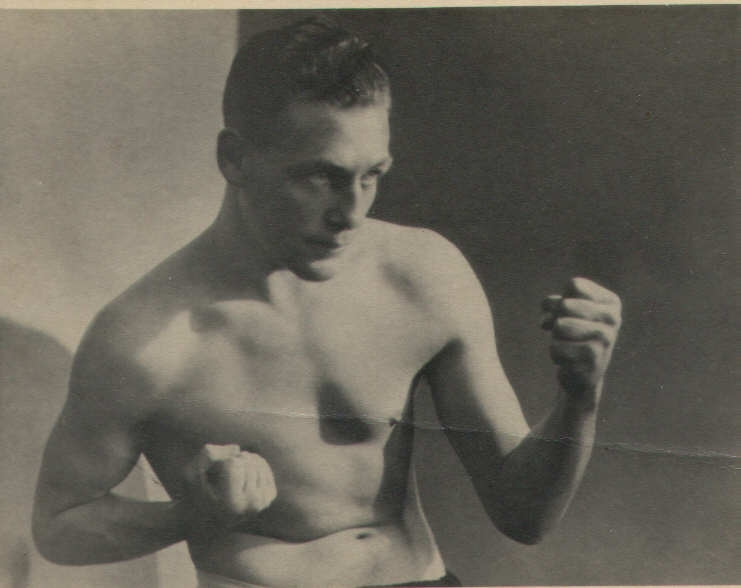

Medal record

Men's Boxing

Representing South Africa

Olympic Games
Gold medal – first place	1924 Paris	Bantamweight

William Alexander Smith (19 July 1904 – 20 December 1955) was a South African bantamweight professional boxer who competed in the 1920s. He was reigning world champion between 1924 and 1928 after winning the gold medal in the 1924 Summer Olympics in the bantamweight category. His family was from Aberdeen, Scotland and Bedfordshire, England.

== Amateur career ==
Willie Smith's boxing career began in a Johannesburg orphanage.

The South African had George Harris to thank for much of his success. Harris, who had become the first SA flyweight champion when he stopped Marcus Henning in Kimberley on 12 November 1909, found time twice a week to give boxing lessons to orphans in the St George's Home in Johannesburg.

Among his pupils was 12-year-old Willie Smith, said to be the terror of the neighbourhood and a boy who hardly needed an excuse to get behind his fists.

Harris taught him as much as he could, but did not convince Smith that there was much more to boxing than battering your opponent into submission.

In 1920, trainer Johnny Watson went to St George's to watch a tournament. He was impressed with Smith's tenacity and ended up in the boy's corner, giving him advice. This was to be the start of a lifelong partnership.

Smith fought all over South Africa and won 32 amateur contests in a year. Watson taught him that defence and tactics were as important as a solid punch and turned the little slugger into a stylish boxer.

In the trials for the 1924 Olympic Games, Smith came up against Harry Tyrell, who later became the father of Springbok soccer goalkeeper Aubrey. Smith won through to represent South Africa in Paris, together with Roy Ingram, Ernie Eustace and Dick Beland.

Smith became the youngest Olympic boxing champion when he won the bantamweight division.

== 1924 Olympic results ==
Below is the record of William H. Smith, a South African bantamweight boxer who competed at the 1924 Paris Olympics:

- Round of 32: bye
- Round of 16: defeated Harry Wolff (Sweden)
- Quarterfinal: defeated Jacques Lemouton (France)
- Semifinal: defeated Jean Ces (France)
- Final: defeated Salvatore Tripoli (United States) - won gold medal

== Pro career ==
He made his professional debut on 25 June 1925 against SA bantamweight champion Scotty Frazer and they fought to an eight-round draw. In a return fight on 26 September, he defeated Frazer on a disqualification in the 13th round.

The bout was billed as being for the SA bantamweight title, but it was not recognised by the Transvaal Boxing Board of Control.

Smith went on to win 11 bouts in a row before meeting Baldock. His victory thrilled his countrymen and there were long queues when a film of the fight went on circuit some weeks later.

The youngster was then taken to the United States and beaten by Dominick Petrone.

After a stay of five months, a despondent Smith decided to return and in 1928 he defeated Young Johnny Brown, Sammy Tucker and Mickey Doyle and drew with Pierre Pothier.

Early in 1929 he went to Australia where he beat Archie Cowan in his first fight. Then he lost in two fights against the slightly lighter Fidel LaBarba (La Barba had also represented USA at the 1924 Paris Olympics, winning Gold as a Flyweight, thus La Barba vs Smith was the first time two Olympic Gold Medalist's faced off in a Professional bout) and was knocked out by a welterweight, Jack Roberts.

On his return, Smith defeated Dolf du Plessis on points over 15 rounds. The bout, held on 30 November 1929, was billed as being for the SA featherweight title, but this was never authenticated.

Smith had two cracks at the Empire bantamweight title, losing to Dick Corbett in 1930 and to Johnny McGrory in December 1936.

He made a determined effort to recapture his old form and outpointed Ernest Wohrer, an Austrian, and then beat Frenchman Maurice Holtzer.

Then the Union Sporting Club brought out Freddie Miller, the former world featherweight champion, to face Smith. Smith was knocked in the sixth round. Only seven weeks later, in a meaningless return match, he was knocked out again, this time in the seventh round.

The curtain finally came down when he was beaten by McGrory. He finished with a record of 39–13–3 (2).

== Retirement ==
Having retired from boxing, Smith spent several years as salesman and commercial traveller before running the Richmond Hotel in Hamburg, near Roodepoort, on the West Rand.

He became one of the best-known South African referees after World War 2. He handled some big fights featuring Johnny Ralph and Vic Toweel, including Toweel's world title bouts against Luis Romero and Jimmy Carruthers.

Smith died of a heart attack in 1955, at the age of 51.
