= Jean Ces =

French boxer (1906–1969)

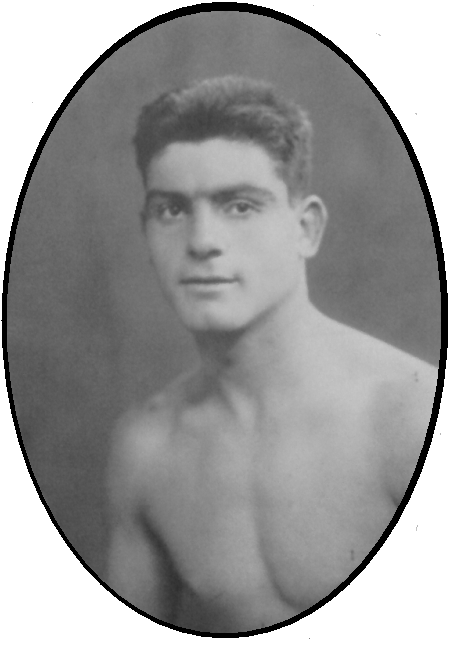

Medal record

Representing France

Men's Boxing

Olympic Games
Bronze medal – third place	1924 Paris	Bantamweight

Jean Ces (5 September 1906 in Béziers – 25 December 1969) was a French bantamweight professional boxer who competed in the 1920s. He won a bronze medal in Boxing at the 1924 Summer Olympics in the bantamweight category, losing against Salvatore Tripoli in the semi-final.
