= Salvatore Tripoli =

American boxer

Medal record

Men's boxing

Representing the United States

Olympic Games
Silver medal – second place	1924 Paris	Bantamweight

Salvatore Peter Tripoli, also known as Jackie Williams (December 5, 1904 – March 7, 1990) was an American bantamweight professional boxer who competed in the 1920s. He won a silver medal for the United States at the 1924 Summer Olympics in Paris, France.

== 1924 Olympic results ==
Below is the record of Salvatore Tripoli, an American bantamweight boxer who competed at the 1924 Paris Olympics:

- Round of 32: defeated Carlos Usaveaga (Chile) on points
- Round of 16: defeated Les Tarrant (Great Britain) on points
- Quarterfinal: defeated Benjamin Pertuzzo (Argentina) on points
- Semifinal: defeated Oscar Andren (Sweden) on points
- Final: lost to William H. Smith (South Africa) on points (was awarded silver medal)
