= Ernest Mignard =

French boxer

Personal information
- Nationality: French
- Born: 17 November 1905
- Died: 4 August 1982 (aged 76)

Sport
- Sport: Boxing

Ernest Mignard (17 November 1905 – 4 August 1982) was a French boxer. He competed in the men's bantamweight event at the 1928 Summer Olympics. At the 1928 Summer Olympics, he lost to Jack Garland of Great Britain.
