= Boxing at the 1928 Summer Olympics – Bantamweight =

Boxing competitions

Men's bantamweight boxing at the Games of the IX Olympiad
- Venue: Krachtsportgebouw
- Date: August 7–11, 1928
- Competitors: 18 from 18 nations

Medalists
1st place, gold medalist(s)		Vittorio Tamagnini	Italy
2nd place, silver medalist(s)		John Daley	United States
3rd place, bronze medalist(s)		Harry Isaacs	South Africa

The men's bantamweight event was part of the boxing programme at the 1928 Summer Olympics. The weight class was the second-lightest contested, and allowed boxers of up to 118 pounds (53.5 kilograms). The competition was held from Tuesday, August 7, 1928 to Saturday, August 11, 1928.

== Results ==
Round of 32; August 7
Osvaldo Sánchez (CHI)	PTS
Stefan Glon (POL)	L
John Daley (USA)	PTS
Ingvald Bjerke (NOR)	L

Round of 16; August 8
Frank Traynor (IRL)	PTS
Fuji Okamoto (JPN)	L
Carmelo Robledo (ARG)	PTS
Raymond Van Rumbeke (BEL)	L
Vittorio Tamagnini (ITA)	PTS
Fidel Ortiz (MEX)	L
John Garland (GBR)	PTS
Ernest Mignard (FRA)	L
Vince Glionna (CAN)	PTS
Hans Ziglarski (GER)	L
Harry Isaacs (RSA)	PTS
Aage Fahrenholtz (DEN)	L
János Széles (HUN)	PTS
Lars Mellström (SWE)	L
Osvaldo Sánchez (CHI)	L
John Daley (USA)	PTS

Quarterfinals; August 9
Frank Traynor (IRL)	PTS
Carmelo Robledo (ARG)	L
Vittorio Tamagnini (ITA)	PTS
John Garland (GBR)	L
Vince Glionna (CAN)	L
Harry Isaacs (RSA)	PTS
János Széles (HUN)	L
John Daley (USA)	PTS

Semifinals; August 10
Frank Traynor (IRL)	L
Vittorio Tamagnini (ITA)	PTS
Harry Isaacs (RSA)	L
John Daley (USA)	PTS

Final; August 11
Vittorio Tamagnini (ITA)	PTS
John Daley (USA)	L
Bronze medal bout
Harry Isaacs (RSA)	PTS
Frank Traynor (IRL)	L
