= Vince Glionna =

Canadian boxer

Vincent Franklin Glionna (February 4, 1906 – October 31, 1973) was a Canadian boxer who competed in the 1928 Summer Olympics. He was born in Toronto, Ontario.

In 1928, he was eliminated in the quarter-finals of the bantamweight class after losing his fight to the eventual bronze medalist Harry Isaacs of South Africa.
