= Fuji Okamoto =

Japanese boxer

Fuji Okamoto (岡本 不二, Okamoto Fuji, July 4, 1905 in Nagoya, Aichi, Japan – January 4, 1984) was a Japanese boxer who competed in the 1928 Summer Olympics.

In 1928 he was eliminated in the second round of the bantamweight class after losing his fight to Frank Traynor of Ireland.

== 1928 Olympic results ==
Below is the record of Fuji Okamoto, a Japanese bantamweight boxer who competed at the 1928 Amsterdam Olympics:

- Round of 32: bye
- Round of 16: lost to Frank Traynor (Ireland) on points
