= Ingvald Bjerke =

Norwegian boxer

Ingvald Johan Bjerke (March 13, 1907 – January 1, 1990) was a Norwegian boxer who competed in the 1928 Summer Olympics.

He was born in Ullensaker and died in Hundorp, but represented the club Oslo AK. In 1928 he was eliminated in the first round of the bantamweight class after losing his fight to the upcoming silver medalist John Daley.
