= Nipper Pat Daly =

Welsh boxer

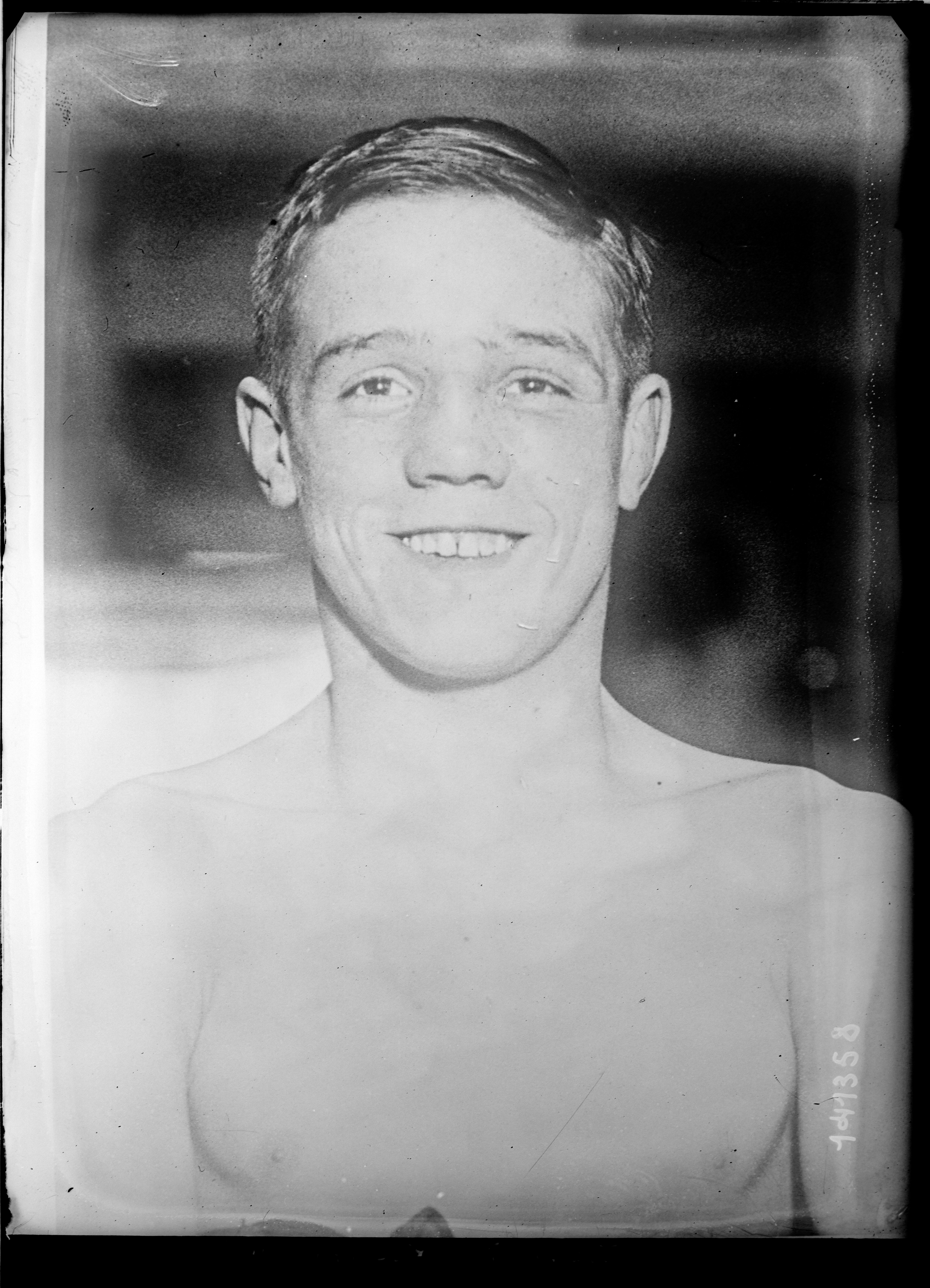

Personal information
- Nationality: British
- Born: Patrick Clifford Daley; 17 February 1913 Abercrave, Powys, Wales, UK
- Died: 25 September 1988 (aged 75)
- Weight: Flyweight, Bantamweight, Featherweight, Lightweight, Welterweight

Boxing career
- Stance: Orthodox

Boxing record
- Total fights: 119
- Wins: 99
- Win by KO: 26
- Losses: 11
- Draws: 8
- No contests: 1

Nipper Pat Daly, real name Patrick Clifford Daley (17 February 1913 – 25 September 1988), was a British boxer who fought professionally between 1923 and 1931. He made his professional debut at the age of nine or 10, achieved widespread fame in his mid teens as British boxing's 'Wonderboy', then retired from pro boxing at age 17.

Renowned sportswriter Frank Butler named Daly 'the best young prospect we ever had'. He is believed to be the youngest boxer ever to make The Ring magazine's top-ten world ratings, and it is thought that he was also the youngest-ever professional boxer. Daly was the grandfather of actress, model and singer Eileen Daly.

== Early life ==
Born in Abercrave, Wales, he moved to Marylebone, London at the age of five, then moved again with his family to the Canadian mining town of Wayne, Alberta in 1920. Within two years the family returned to Marylebone, and shortly afterwards he started to take boxing lessons at the Marylebone Road gym of 'Professor' Andrew Newton, one of Britain's leading trainers of the day, who coached and managed Daly for most of his career.

== Professional career ==
=== Early pro debut ===
Daly's natural aptitude for the sport, combined with Professor Newton's coaching, saw his boxing skill develop at an astonishing rate; so much so that he was entered into his first professional fight at the age of just nine or 10. During the next few years he amassed a long string of victories, fighting at small venues in and around London, often conceding age, height and weight to opponents.

In June 1927, though aged only 14, Daly served as a sparring partner to the reigning world middleweight champion Mickey Walker, who was in London preparing for a world-title defence against Scotland's Tommy Milligan. Walker and his manager, Jack 'Doc' Kearns, were said to be astounded by the young boxer's talent.

Daly fought his first 15-round contest in October 1927 (still aged just 14), and boxed often over that distance throughout the remainder of his career. By the end of 1927, Britain's boxing trade paper Boxing (forerunner to Boxing News) was tipping him as a likely future world champion.

=== Top flyweight contender at age 15 ===
During 1928 he fought 25 times, defeating many of Britain's leading flyweights, plus the reigning flyweight champion of Italy, Giovanni Sili. A points win over top British flyweight title contender (and future British flyweight champion) Bert Kirby, put Daly in line for a shot at the title, then held by Leith's Johnny Hill. But by late 1928 Daly had outgrown the flyweight class and did not get a title shot. By early 1929 he had moved up to bantamweight.

=== World ranked at age 16 ===
1929 proved to be Daly's busiest year as a boxer: he had 33 contests, of which he won 29, lost 3 (all inside the distance) and drew 1. Among his fights were victories over some of Europe's best bantamweight and featherweight boxers, including the reigning Belgian bantamweight champion (and future European bantamweight champion) Petit Biquet, recently dethroned British bantamweight champion Alf "Kid" Pattenden, future British bantamweight champion Dick Corbett, former Olympian and ABA bantamweight champion Jack Garland, and German flyweight and bantamweight champion Karl Schulze. There were widespread calls within the press for Daly to be allowed to fight for the British bantamweight title, then held by Teddy Baldock, but a recently introduced BBB of C regulation (later altered) prevented boxers aged under 21 from contesting British titles.

In its September 1929 issue, The Ring magazine ranked Nipper Pat Daly at number 10 in the world at bantamweight (ratings for the month of July) – he was then aged just 16. Shortly afterwards, the veteran boxing impresario Tom O'Rourke offered to bring him to the USA for a series of fights, with the aim of entering him in a world title fight against the newly crowned world featherweight champion Battling Battalino. But Daly's manager, who had signed him under a strict contract, refused to let him go to the States.

On 9 October 1929, he fought the reigning British featherweight champion, Johnny Cuthbert, over 12 three-minute rounds, but suffered weight-making trouble in the run-up to the fight. According to newspaper reports, Daly outboxed the champion and was leading on points when knocked out in the eighth round.

=== Retirement from boxing at age 17 ===
By early 1930, Daly had moved into the lightweight division, and in March that year, in an article headed 'England's future champions', the Daily Express picked him as the country's most likely future world boxing champion.

On 20 April 1930, he fought future British featherweight champion and world-title challenger Seaman Tommy Watson, but again had weight-making difficulty in the run-up to the fight. Despite outboxing Watson for much of the contest, Daly was stopped in the 11th round, after being knocked down several times. He suffered concussion as a result of the fight and was unable to walk properly for several weeks. On 5 June 1930, he was hastily entered into a contest with Trealaw's Nobby Baker while still suffering from concussion and was stopped in the 13th round.

After a four-month break from boxing, Daly tried to make a comeback. He had nine further contests: winning seven, losing one and drawing one. But the caliber of these opponents was far beneath the class of the men he had met previously, and press reports were unanimous in the assertion that his form had deteriorated markedly. It was widely held that, under his manager's direction, he had paid the price for having too many contests at too high a level, at too young an age. Realising, as he put it, that he would 'never be a world champion now' he decided to retire from boxing. He had his last fight on 27 January 1931 – exactly three weeks before his 18th birthday.

=== Boxing style ===
Daly was renowned for his hard, fast, accurate left jab, his quick, clever footwork, punching variety, ring intelligence and all-round boxing skill, coupled with a mastery of in-fighting as well as long-range boxing. He had an attacking style that entertained the crowds, but he tempered this with exceptional defensive skills. As a growing teenager predominantly fighting full-grown men he was not noted as a knockout puncher.

== Later years ==
After retiring, Daly stayed involved with boxing and for much of his life served as a trainer during his spare time. In the late 1940s and early 1950s he ran a gym at New North Road in Shoreditch, from where he trained amateur boxers and also managed and trained a few professionals.

In the 1980s, he retired to Hastings, East Sussex, where he died on 25 September 1988.

== Professional boxing record ==
| 119 fights | 99 wins | 11 losses |
|---|---|---|
| By knockout | 26 | 7 |
| By decision | 68 | 3 |
| By disqualification | 5 | 1 |
| Draws | 8 | |
| No contests | 1 | |

| No. | Result | Record | Opponent | Type | Round | Date | Age | Location | Notes |
|---|---|---|---|---|---|---|---|---|---|
| 119 | Win | 99–11–8 (1) | Harry Jenkins | RTD | 4 (12) | Jan 27, 1931 | 17 years, 344 days | Paddington Baths, Paddington, London, England | |
| 118 | Win | 98–11–8 (1) | Tom Handley | PTS | 12 | Jan 6, 1931 | 17 years, 323 days | Paddington Baths, Paddington, London, England | |
| 117 | Win | 97–11–8 (1) | Andre Beghin | TKO | 4 (12) | Dec 28, 1930 | 17 years, 314 days | Vale Hall, Kilburn, London, England | |
| 116 | Win | 96–11–8 (1) | Albert Ryall | TKO | 4 (12) | Dec 23, 1930 | 17 years, 309 days | Paddington Baths, Paddington, London, England | |
| 115 | Win | 95–11–8 (1) | Johnny Allen | TKO | 4 (12) | Dec 7, 1930 | 17 years, 293 days | Vale Hall, Kilburn, London, England | |
| 114 | Win | 94–11–8 (1) | Dave Danahar | TKO | 9 (12) | Dec 2, 1930 | 17 years, 288 days | Paddington Baths, Paddington, London, England | |
| 113 | Win | 93–11–8 (1) | Jimmy Laws | KO | 3 (12) | Nov 23, 1930 | 17 years, 279 days | Vale Hall, Kilburn, London, England | |
| 112 | Draw | 92–11–8 (1) | Fred Green | PTS | 12 | Nov 18, 1930 | 17 years, 274 days | Paddington Baths, Paddington, London, England | |
| 111 | Loss | 92–11–7 (1) | Tom Banks | PTS | 6 | Oct 28, 1930 | 17 years, 253 days | Premierland, Whitechapel, London, England | |
| 110 | Loss | 92–10–7 (1) | Nobby Baker | TKO | 13 (15) | Jun 5, 1930 | 17 years, 108 days | Premierland, Whitechapel, London, England | |
| 109 | Loss | 92–9–7 (1) | Tommy Watson | TKO | 11 (15) | Apr 20, 1930 | 17 years, 62 days | Vale Hall, Kilburn, London, England | |
| 108 | Win | 92–8–7 (1) | Albert Baudaert | PTS | 8 | Apr 3, 1930 | 17 years, 45 days | Holborn Stadium Club, Holborn, London, England | |
| 107 | Win | 91–8–7 (1) | Len George | PTS | 8 | Apr 1, 1930 | 17 years, 43 days | Paddington Baths, Paddington, London, England | |
| 106 | Win | 90–8–7 (1) | Auguste Gyde | PTS | 15 | Mar 26, 1930 | 17 years, 37 days | Paddington Baths, Paddington, London, England | |
| 105 | Win | 89–8–7 (1) | Jack Sheppard | TKO | 12 (15) | Mar 21, 1930 | 17 years, 32 days | Civic Hall, Exeter, Devon, England | |
| 104 | Win | 88–8–7 (1) | Jim Briley | TKO | 6 (15) | Mar 9, 1930 | 17 years, 20 days | Premierland, Whitechapel, London, England | |
| 103 | Win | 87–8–7 (1) | Charlie Mack | PTS | 15 | Mar 2, 1930 | 17 years, 13 days | Vale Hall, Kilburn, London, England | |
| 102 | Win | 86–8–7 (1) | Jack Sheppard | PTS | 15 | Feb 21, 1930 | 17 years, 4 days | Civic Hall, Exeter, Devon, England | |
| 101 | Draw | 85–8–7 (1) | Charlie Mack | PTS | 15 | Jan 27, 1930 | 16 years, 344 days | Victoria Baths, Nottingham, Nottinghamshire, England | |
| 100 | Win | 85–8–6 (1) | Jack Wright | DQ | 6 (15) | Jan 19, 1930 | 16 years, 336 days | Vale Hall, Kilburn, London, England | |
| 99 | Win | 84–8–6 (1) | Jim Briley | PTS | 15 | Nov 24, 1929 | 16 years, 280 days | Premierland, Whitechapel, London, England | |
| 98 | Win | 83–8–6 (1) | Johnny Edmunds | KO | 2 (15) | Nov 17, 1929 | 16 years, 273 days | Collins's Music Hall, Islington, London, England | |
| 97 | Win | 82–8–6 (1) | Ted Cullen | DQ | 4 (15) | Nov 11, 1929 | 16 years, 267 days | Victoria Baths, Nottingham, Nottinghamshire, England | |
| 96 | Win | 81–8–6 (1) | Harry Kid Berry | PTS | 15 | Nov 6, 1929 | 16 years, 262 days | National Sporting Club (Holborn Stadium), Holborn, London, England | |
| 95 | Loss | 80–8–6 (1) | Jim Ashley | TKO | 3 (15) | Oct 31, 1929 | 16 years, 256 days | Ilford Skating Rink, Ilford, Essex, England | |
| 94 | Win | 80–7–6 (1) | Jack Millard | TKO | 8 (15) | Oct 23, 1929 | 16 years, 248 days | Paddington Baths, Paddington, London, England | |
| 93 | Loss | 79–7–6 (1) | Johnny Cuthbert | KO | 8 (12) | Oct 9, 1929 | 16 years, 234 days | Holborn Stadium Club, Holborn, London, England | |
| 92 | Win | 79–6–6 (1) | Arques Treves | KO | 2 (15) | Oct 3, 1929 | 16 years, 228 days | Ilford Skating Rink, Ilford, Essex, England | |
| 91 | Win | 78–6–6 (1) | Billy Cain | RTD | 7 (15) | Sep 15, 1929 | 16 years, 210 days | West Bromwich Rink Athletic Club, West Bromwich, West Midlands, England | |
| 90 | Win | 77–6–6 (1) | Lew Pinkus | PTS | 15 | Sep 8, 1929 | 16 years, 203 days | Collins Music Hall, Islington, London, England | |
| 89 | Win | 76–6–6 (1) | Con Lewis | RTD | 7 (10) | Sep 1, 1929 | 16 years, 196 days | Vale Hall, Kilburn, London, England | |
| 88 | Win | 75–6–6 (1) | Karl Schulze | KO | 5 (10) | Aug 23, 1929 | 16 years, 187 days | Sportpalast, Schoeneberg, Berlin, Weimar Republic | |
| 87 | Win | 74–6–6 (1) | Jack Garland | PTS | 12 | Aug 11, 1929 | 16 years, 175 days | Premierland, Whitechapel, London, England | |
| 86 | Win | 73–6–6 (1) | Tommy Rose | KO | 3 (15) | Aug 5, 1929 | 16 years, 169 days | Blackpool Football Ground, Blackpool, Lancashire, England | |
| 85 | Win | 72–6–6 (1) | Alf Pattenden | PTS | 15 | Jul 7, 1929 | 16 years, 140 days | Premierland, Whitechapel, London, England | |
| 84 | Win | 71–6–6 (1) | Jack Garland | PTS | 8 | Jun 21, 1929 | 16 years, 124 days | Clapton Stadium, Clapton, London, England | |
| 83 | Draw | 70–6–6 (1) | Jim Crawford | PTS | 15 | Jun 13, 1929 | 16 years, 116 days | Liverpool Stadium, Liverpool, Merseyside, England | |
| 82 | Loss | 70–6–5 (1) | Douglas Parker | KO | 1 (15) | Jun 8, 1929 | 16 years, 111 days | Holmeside Stadium, Sunderland, Tyne and Wear, England | |
| 81 | Win | 70–5–5 (1) | Jim Crawford | PTS | 15 | May 23, 1929 | 16 years, 95 days | Liverpool Stadium, Liverpool, Merseyside, England | |
| 80 | Win | 69–5–5 (1) | Joe Greenwood | TKO | 8 (15) | May 18, 1929 | 16 years, 90 days | Holmeside Stadium, Sunderland, Tyne and Wear, England | |
| 79 | Win | 68–5–5 (1) | Kid Socks | PTS | 15 | May 12, 1929 | 16 years, 84 days | Premierland, Whitechapel, London, England | |
| 78 | Win | 67–5–5 (1) | Dick Corbett | PTS | 10 | May 2, 1929 | 16 years, 74 days | Royal Albert Hall, Kensington, London, England | |
| 77 | Win | 66–5–5 (1) | Packey McFarland | PTS | 15 | Apr 12, 1929 | 16 years, 54 days | Connaught Drill Hall, Portsmouth, Hampshire, England | |
| 76 | Win | 65–5–5 (1) | Arthur Young Adkins | PTS | 15 | Apr 8, 1929 | 16 years, 50 days | Victoria Baths, Nottingham, Nottinghamshire, England | |
| 75 | Win | 64–5–5 (1) | Nicolas Petit Biquet | PTS | 10 | Mar 21, 1929 | 16 years, 32 days | Royal Albert Hall, Kensington, London, England | |
| 74 | Win | 63–5–5 (1) | Tommy Brown | TKO | 12 (15) | Mar 9, 1929 | 16 years, 20 days | Holmeside Stadium, Sunderland, Tyne and Wear, England | |
| 73 | Win | 62–5–5 (1) | Archie Woodbine | TKO | 5 (15) | Mar 1, 1929 | 16 years, 12 days | Connaught Drill Hall, Portsmouth, Hampshire, England | |
| 72 | Win | 61–5–5 (1) | Billy Boulger | PTS | 15 | Feb 24, 1929 | 16 years, 7 days | Premierland, Whitechapel, London, England | |
| 71 | Win | 60–5–5 (1) | Jimmy Rowbotham | PTS | 12 | Feb 17, 1929 | 16 years, 0 days | Palais de Dance Athletic Club, West Bromwich, West Midlands, England | |
| 70 | Win | 59–5–5 (1) | Billy Smith | PTS | 15 | Jan 26, 1929 | 15 years, 344 days | Holmeside Stadium, Sunderland, Tyne and Wear, England | |
| 69 | Win | 58–5–5 (1) | Jimmy Rowbotham | PTS | 15 | Jan 14, 1929 | 15 years, 332 days | Alcazar, Edmonton, London, England | |
| 68 | Win | 57–5–5 (1) | Arthur Boddington | PTS | 10 | Jan 9, 1929 | 15 years, 327 days | National Sporting Club, Covent Garden, London, England | |
| 67 | Win | 56–5–5 (1) | Willi Metzner | DQ | 2 (6) | Jan 7, 1929 | 15 years, 325 days | Rheinlandhalle, Cologne, Nordrhein-Westfalen, Weimar Republic | |
| 66 | Win | 55–5–5 (1) | Tiny Smith | PTS | 15 | Dec 22, 1928 | 15 years, 309 days | Holmeside Stadium, Sunderland, Tyne and Wear, England | |
| 65 | Win | 54–5–5 (1) | Bert Kirby | PTS | 12 | Dec 17, 1928 | 15 years, 304 days | Alexandra Theatre, Birmingham, West Midlands, England | |
| 64 | Win | 53–5–5 (1) | Young Dick McManus | PTS | 15 | Dec 11, 1928 | 15 years, 298 days | Promenade Pier, Plymouth, Devon, England | |
| 63 | Win | 52–5–5 (1) | George Garrard | PTS | 8 | Dec 6, 1928 | 15 years, 293 days | Royal Albert Hall, Kensington, London, England | |
| 62 | Win | 51–5–5 (1) | Johnny Young Murton | DQ | 5 (15) | Nov 26, 1928 | 15 years, 283 days | Alcazar, Edmonton, London, England | Low blow disqualification |
| 61 | Win | 50–5–5 (1) | Frank Kestrell | TKO | 12 (15) | Nov 8, 1928 | 15 years, 265 days | The Ring, Blackfriars Road, Southwark, London, England | |
| 60 | Win | 49–5–5 (1) | Jack Connell | TKO | 9 (15) | Nov 4, 1928 | 15 years, 261 days | Premierland, Whitechapel, London, England | |
| 59 | Win | 48–5–5 (1) | Billy Yates | TKO | 7 (15) | Oct 21, 1928 | 15 years, 247 days | Manor Hall, Hackney, London, England | |
| 58 | Win | 47–5–5 (1) | Ludwig Minow | PTS | 6 | Sep 30, 1928 | 15 years, 226 days | Westfalenhalle, Dortmund, Nordrhein-Westfalen, Weimar Republic | |
| 57 | Loss | 46–5–5 (1) | Dod Oldfield | PTS | 15 | Jun 21, 1928 | 15 years, 125 days | Ilford Skating Rink, Ilford, Essex, England | |
| 56 | Win | 46–4–5 (1) | Kid Rich | PTS | 15 | Jun 7, 1928 | 15 years, 111 days | Premierland, Whitechapel, London, England | |
| 55 | Win | 45–4–5 (1) | Giovanni Sili | PTS | 10 | May 18, 1928 | 15 years, 91 days | National Sporting Club, Covent Garden, London, England | |
| 54 | Loss | 44–4–5 (1) | Young Siki | RTD | 4 (15) | Apr 29, 1928 | 15 years, 72 days | Premierland, Whitechapel, London, England | |
| 53 | Draw | 44–3–5 (1) | Lud Abella | PTS | 15 | Apr 1, 1928 | 15 years, 44 days | Premierland, Whitechapel, London, England | |
| 52 | Win | 44–3–4 (1) | Jimmy Lindsay | PTS | 15 | Mar 28, 1928 | 15 years, 40 days | Fulham Baths, Fulham, London, England | |
| 51 | Win | 43–3–4 (1) | Tommy Brown | PTS | 12 | Mar 19, 1928 | 15 years, 31 days | King Street Drill Hall, Blackburn, Lancashire, England | |
| 50 | Win | 42–3–4 (1) | Lud Abella | PTS | 15 | Mar 15, 1928 | 15 years, 27 days | Liverpool Stadium, Pudsey Street, Liverpool, Merseyside, England | |
| 49 | NC | 41–3–4 (1) | Mark Lesnick | NC | 11 (15) | Mar 11, 1928 | 15 years, 23 days | Premierland, Whitechapel, London, England | |
| 48 | Win | 41–3–4 | Johnny (Young) Summers | PTS | 15 | Mar 5, 1928 | 15 years, 17 days | Armoury, Stockport, Cheshire, England | |
| 47 | Win | 40–3–4 | Harry Yates | PTS | 10 | Feb 19, 1928 | 15 years, 2 days | National Sporting Club, Leeds, Yorkshire, England | |
| 46 | Win | 39–3–4 | Kid Rich | PTS | 12 | Feb 5, 1928 | 14 years, 353 days | Premierland, Whitechapel, London, England | |
| 45 | Win | 38–3–4 | Fred Bromley | PTS | 12 | Jan 29, 1928 | 14 years, 346 days | Premierland, Whitechapel, London, England | |
| 44 | Win | 37–3–4 | Kid Rich | PTS | 12 | Jan 16, 1928 | 14 years, 333 days | Premierland, Whitechapel, London, England | |
| 43 | Win | 36–3–4 | Johnny (Young) Summers | PTS | 12 | Jan 6, 1928 | 14 years, 323 days | Marathon Stadium, Preston, Lancashire, England | |
| 42 | Win | 35–3–4 | Walter (Boy) Sharpe | TKO | 6 (10) | Jan 2, 1928 | 14 years, 319 days | Victoria Baths, Nottingham, Nottinghamshire, England | |
| 41 | Win | 34–3–4 | Jimmy Thornton | DQ | 6 (15) | Dec 29, 1927 | 14 years, 315 days | Premierland, Whitechapel, London, England | Thornton disqualified for repeated holding |
| 40 | Win | 33–3–4 | Ginger Johnson | PTS | 10 | Dec 19, 1927 | 14 years, 305 days | Corn Exchange, Peterborough, Cambridgeshire, England | |
| 39 | Win | 32–3–4 | Alf Young Thornhill | PTS | 15 | Nov 28, 1927 | 14 years, 284 days | Premierland, Whitechapel, London, England | |
| 38 | Win | 31–3–4 | Tom Fitzsimmons | PTS | 10 | Nov 21, 1927 | 14 years, 277 days | Victoria Baths, Nottingham, Nottinghamshire, England | |
| 37 | Win | 30–3–4 | Dickie Inkles | PTS | 15 | Nov 10, 1927 | 14 years, 266 days | Premierland, Whitechapel, London, England | |
| 36 | Win | 29–3–4 | Jack Ellis | PTS | 15 | Oct 31, 1927 | 14 years, 256 days | Premierland, Whitechapel, London, England | |
| 35 | Win | 28–3–4 | Jack Glover | PTS | 15 | Oct 17, 1927 | 14 years, 242 days | Premierland, Whitechapel, London, England | |
| 34 | Draw | 27–3–4 | Jack Ellis | PTS | 15 | Oct 3, 1927 | 14 years, 228 days | Premierland, Whitechapel, London, England | |
| 33 | Win | 27–3–3 | Alf Gudge | PTS | 10 | Jul 21, 1927 | 14 years, 154 days | Premierland, Whitechapel, London, England | |
| 32 | Win | 26–3–3 | Tom Tank Fowler | PTS | 10 | Jul 10, 1927 | 14 years, 143 days | Premierland, Whitechapel, London, England | |
| 31 | Win | 25–3–3 | Charlie Rowbotham | TKO | 5 (10) | Jul 3, 1927 | 14 years, 136 days | Premierland, Whitechapel, London, England | |
| 30 | Win | 24–3–3 | Johnny Silver | PTS | 10 | Jun 16, 1927 | 14 years, 119 days | Premierland, Whitechapel, London, England | |
| 29 | Win | 23–3–3 | Taff Sharpe | KO | 4 (6) | May 2, 1927 | 14 years, 74 days | The Alcazar, Edmonton, London, England | |
| 28 | Win | 22–3–3 | Taff Sharpe | RTD | 3 (8) | Feb 2, 1927 | 13 years, 350 days | Pembroke Garage Club, Hyde Park Corner, London, England | |
| 27 | Win | 21–3–3 | George Brown | PTS | 8 | Dec 2, 1926 | 13 years, 288 days | Pembroke Garage Club, Hyde Park Corner, London, England | |
| 26 | Win | 20–3–3 | Johnny (Young) Summers | PTS | 6 | Nov 8, 1926 | 13 years, 264 days | National Sporting Club, Covent Garden, London, England | |
| 25 | Loss | 19–3–3 | Moe Mizler | TKO | 5 (10) | Apr 15, 1926 | 13 years, 57 days | Premierland, Whitechapel, London, England | Head-on collision during the fifth round, Nipper sustained a very nasty cut over the eyes |
| 24 | Loss | 19–2–3 | Boyce Deary | DQ | 8 (10) | Feb 15, 1926 | 12 years, 363 days | Premierland, Whitechapel, London, England | Daly disqualified for a 'low punch', which was obviously accidental |
| 23 | Win | 19–1–3 | George Brown | PTS | 6 | Feb 14, 1926 | 12 years, 362 days | Winter Gardens, Peckham, London, England | |
| 22 | Draw | 18–1–3 | Teddy Tompkins | PTS | 10 | Jan 25, 1926 | 12 years, 342 days | British Legion, Pimlico, London, England | |
| 21 | Win | 18–1–2 | Johnny Quill | PTS | 10 | Jan 10, 1926 | 12 years, 327 days | Premierland, Whitechapel, London, England | |
| 20 | Win | 17–1–2 | Sid Raiteri | PTS | 6 | Jan 1, 1926 | 12 | Winter Gardens, Peckham, London, England | Day and month unknown |
| 19 | Win | 16–1–2 | Teddy Tompkins | PTS | 6 | Dec 17, 1925 | 12 years, 303 days | British Legion, Pimlico, London, England | |
| 18 | Win | 15–1–2 | Charlie Mack | PTS | 6 | Nov 18, 1925 | 12 years, 274 days | National Sporting Club, Covent Garden, London, England | |
| 17 | Draw | 14–1–2 | Jim Hocking | PTS | 6 | Nov 4, 1925 | 12 years, 260 days | National Sporting Club, Covent Garden, London, England | |
| 16 | Win | 14–1–1 | Charlie Mack | PTS | 6 | Nov 2, 1925 | 12 years, 258 days | Ilford Skating Rink, Ilford, Essex, England | |
| 15 | Win | 13–1–1 | Charlie Mack | PTS | 10 | Nov 1, 1925 | 12 years, 257 days | Winter Gardens, Peckham, London, England | |
| 14 | Win | 12–1–1 | Johnny (Young) Summers | PTS | 8 | Oct 4, 1925 | 12 years, 229 days | Manor Hall, Hackney, London, England | |
| 13 | Win | 11–1–1 | Jim Hocking | PTS | 6 | Sep 3, 1925 | 12 years, 199 days | Premierland, Whitechapel, London, England | |
| 12 | Win | 10–1–1 | Charlie Mack | PTS | 6 | Aug 3, 1925 | 12 years, 167 days | Prestwood, Buckinghamshire, England | |
| 11 | Loss | 9–1–1 | Billy Boulger | PTS | 6 | Jul 30, 1925 | 12 years, 163 days | Premierland, Whitechapel, London, England | |
| 10 | Win | 9–0–1 | Young King | KO | 1 (6) | Jul 11, 1925 | N/A | Becontree, London, England | Date uncertain |
| 9 | Win | 8–0–1 | Young Deary | PTS | 6 | Mar 1, 1925 | N/A | Central Hall, Canning Town, London, England | Exact date unknown |
| 8 | Win | 7–0–1 | Young Brooks | PTS | 6 | Nov 30, 1924 | 11 years, 287 days | Manor Hall, Hackney, London, England | |
| 7 | Win | 6–0–1 | Johnny (Young) Summers | PTS | 6 | Oct 6, 1924 | 11 years, 232 days | Town Hall, Sidcup, Kent, England | |
| 6 | Win | 5–0–1 | Johnny (Young) Summers | PTS | 6 | Oct 5, 1924 | 11 years, 231 days | Manor Hall, Hackney, London, England | |
| 5 | Win | 4–0–1 | Johnny (Young) Summers | PTS | 6 | Oct 5, 1924 | 11 years, 231 days | Winter Gardens, Peckham, London, England | |
| 4 | Win | 3–0–1 | Young Smock | PTS | 6 | Sep 1, 1924 | N/A | Winter Gardens, Peckham, London, England | Exact date unknown |
| 3 | Draw | 2–0–1 | Ernest Morris | PTS | 3 | Aug 4, 1924 | 11 years, 169 days | Prestwood, Buckinghamshire, England | |
| 2 | Win | 2–0 | John Brent | PTS | 6 | Jan 1, 1924 | N/A | Euston, London, England | Day and month unknown |
| 1 | Win | 1–0 | George Brown | PTS | 4 | Jan 1, 1923 | N/A | Marylebone, London, England | Day and month unknown |
