= Stefan Glon =

Polish boxer

Stefan Glon (also known as Stefan Głon, 2 July 1908 – 10 March 1957) was a Polish boxer who competed in the 1928 Summer Olympics.

He was born in Berlin, German Empire and died 1957 in Żyrardów.

In 1928 he was eliminated in the first round of the bantamweight class after losing his fight to the upcoming silver medalist John Daley.
