= Lars Mellström =

Swedish boxer

Lars Gustav Fredrik Mellström (September 14, 1904 – May 4, 1983) was a Swedish boxer for Hammarby IF who competed in the 1928 Summer Olympics.

In that year, he was eliminated in the second round of the bantamweight class after losing his fight to János Széles.
