= Alf Pattenden =

English boxer

Alf "Kid" Pattenden
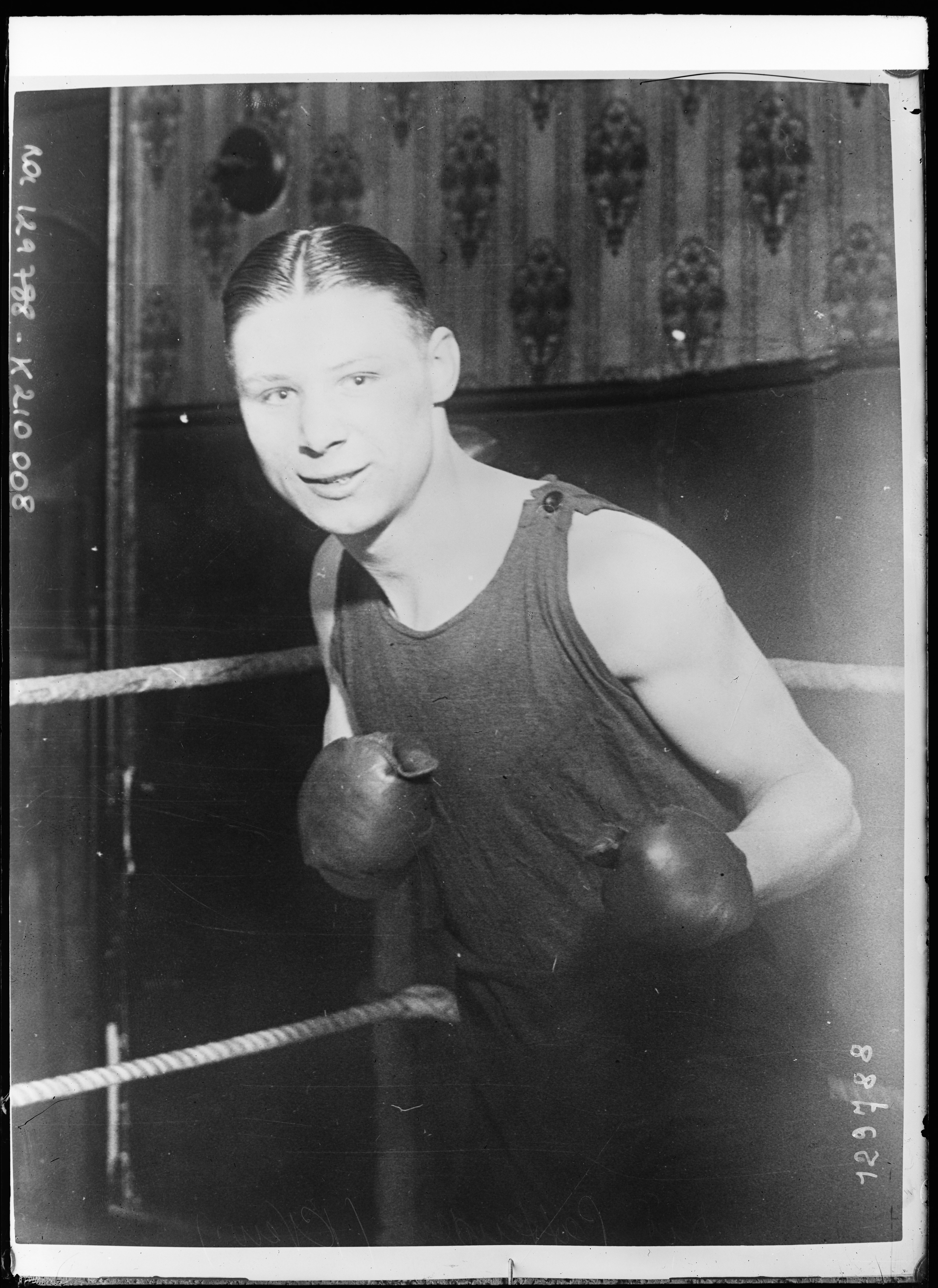

Personal information
- Nationality: British
- Born: Alfred Edward Pattenden; 21 November 1907
- Died: 1976
- Weight: Bantamweight

Boxing career

Boxing record
- Total fights: 71
- Wins: 38
- Win by KO: 20
- Losses: 27
- Draws: 6

Alfred Edward "Alf" Pattenden (21 November 1907 – 1976), also known as Kid Pattenden, was a British boxer who was British bantamweight champion between 1928 and 1929.

== Career ==
From Bethnal Green in London, Pattenden made his professional debut in July 1926 with a win over Billy Clark. He won his first 14 fights, including victories over Frankie Ash, Nel Tarleton, George "Kid" Nicholson, and Harry Stein. His first defeat came in April 1927 against the American Milton Cohen, starting a run of five fights without a win, including a draw and a loss to Archie Bell. He returned to winning ways in August against Len Fowler, and recorded wins against Young Jackie Brown, Kid Socks, European champion Johnny Brown, Young Stanley, Jean Julien, and Young Johnny Brown, setting up a shot at the British title.

In June 1928 he faced Nicholson at the National Sporting Club for the British bantamweight title that had been taken from Johnny Brown due to his failure to defend it for almost three years. Pattenden knocked Nicholson out in the twelfth round to become the new British champion. He made the first defence of his title in November 1928, stopping Young Johnny Brown in the twelfth round. In February 1929 he lost on points to Tarleton, and a month later fought Henri Poutrain with the same result. He won his next two fights before making a second defence of the British title in May 1929 against his East London rival Teddy Baldock, with the British Empire title also at stake. the Fight went the full 15 rounds, with Baldock getting the decision.

Pattenden suffered further defeats at the hands of Nipper Pat Daly and Len "Tiger" Smith in his next two fights. He put together some better results, despite being out for several months due to burns to his hands sustained in September 1929, and in March 1930 faced Dick Corbett in what was effectively a British title eliminator at the Royal Albert Hall. Corbett took the points decision. Pattenden beat Jimmy Rowbotham in his next fight, but was never again in contention for a title, losing 16 of his last 21 fights, including a second defeat to Baldock, before retiring in 1931 due to eye problems.
