= Hammarby IF Boxning =

Boxing club in Stockholm, Sweden

- Full name: Hammarby IF Boxningsförening
- Short name(s): Hammarby Boxning, Bajen Boxning
- Founded: 1919; 106 years ago
- Location: Stockholm, Sweden
- Gym(s): Kocksgatan 24
- President: Åke Andersson
- Coach(es): Joel Grandell

Hammarby IF Boxningsförening, commonly known as Hammarby Boxning, is a Swedish boxing club based in Stockholm. It is one of Sweden's oldest boxing clubs, founded in 1919, and a section of Hammarby IF. Their gym is located in Södermalm, an area the club considers its heartland.

== History ==
The boxing department was founded in 1919 as part of the multi-sports club Hammarby IF. Together with nine other clubs, Hammarby also helped to form the Swedish Boxing Association the same year. The members of Hammarby exclusively consisted of young men from the working class, employed as industrial workers at one of the many factories in the Södermalm district.

Hammarby produced several successful amateur boxers in the 1920s, among those Lars Mellström and most notably Gunnar Berggren, who finished third in the lightweight class at the 1928 Olympics in Amsterdam. Berggren is the only Hammarby athlete that has ever won an Olympic medal in an individual sport. In 1930, however, Hammarby found themselves in financial difficulties, after arranging a loss-making boxing gala at Cirkus, and the boxing department was dissolved.

In 1969, Hammarby took up boxing again, merging with local clubs Sparta BK and Årsta BK. The same year, the club moved into its current gym at Kocksgatan in the central part of Södermalm, which is the oldest of its kind in Sweden. The acclaimed writer and illustrator Stig "Slas" Claesson started train at the club and helped to raise funds, later being elected an honorary member for life. An other frequent celebrity guest in the 1970s was singer Olle Adolphson.

In the 1980s, thanks to journalist and lifelong Hammarby-fan Börje Dorch, the club recruited Lotfi Ayed and Roger Andersson, who both went on to win several Swedish Championships.

Since 2014, Hammarby has arranged the annual boxing gala "Bajen Rough House" in Eriksdalshallen, attracting an attendance of roughly 1,000 people, facing other clubs such as local rivals Djurgårdens IF and Panathinaikos from Greece.

In modern days, Hammarby boxer Anthony Yigit has achieved international success by winning the 2017 European Championships.

== Honours ==
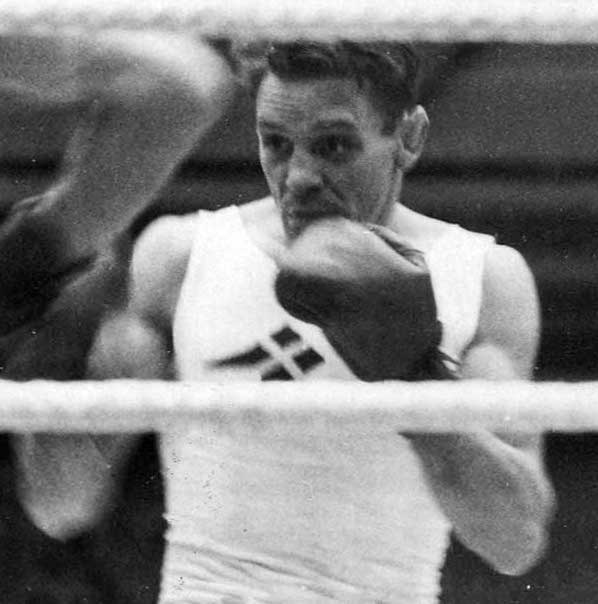
Gunnar Berggren won the bronze medal at the 1928 Olympics.

- Swedish Championships
  - Winners (22):
    - Axel Berggren (1922 welterweight), (1924 lightweight).
    - Lars Mellström (1925 bantamweight).
    - Gunnar Berggren (1925 lightweight), (1926 lightweight), (1927 lightweight), (1928 welterweight).
    - Leif Magnusson (1970 bantamweight), (1972 bantamweight).
    - Åke Andersson (1971 light heavyweight), (1972 light heavyweight).
    - Roger Andersson (1983 super heavyweight).
    - Lotfi Ayed (1983 middleweight), (1984 super middleweight).
    - Josef Barciak (1987 super flyweight).
    - Leon Chartoi (2014 super middleweight), (2015 super middleweight)
    - Robin Safar (2015 heavyweight), (2016 super heavyweight).
    - Ali Yusefi (2017 lightweight).
    - Adam Chartoi (2018 super middleweight).
    - Liridon Nuha (2018 heavyweight).
- European Championships
  - Winners (1):
    - Anthony Yigit (2017 super lightweight).
- Olympic medalists
  - Bronze (1):
    - Gunnar Berggren (1928 lightweight).
