= Osvaldo Sánchez =

Chilean boxer

Personal information
- Nationality: Chilean
- Born: 9 January 1911

Sport
- Sport: Boxing

Osvaldo Sánchez (born 9 January 1911, date of death unknown) was a Chilean boxer. He competed in the men's bantamweight event at the 1928 Summer Olympics.
