= Vittorio Tamagnini =

Italian boxer (1910–1981)

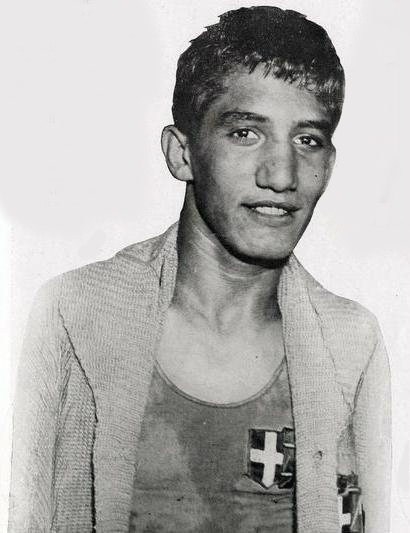

Medal record

Men's Boxing

Olympic Games
Gold medal – first place	1928 Amsterdam	Bantamweight

Vittorio Tamagnini (10 February 1910 – 20 January 1981) was a bantamweight professional boxer from Italy, who won the gold medal at the 1928 Summer Olympics in Amsterdam, Netherlands.

== Olympic results ==
- Round of 32: bye
- Round of 16: Defeated Fidel Ortiz (Mexico) points
- Quarterfinal: Defeated Jack Garland (Great Britain) points
- Semifinal: Defeated Frank Traynor (Ireland) points
- Final: Defeated John Daley (United States) points (won gold medal)
