= Gunnar Berggren =

Swedish boxer

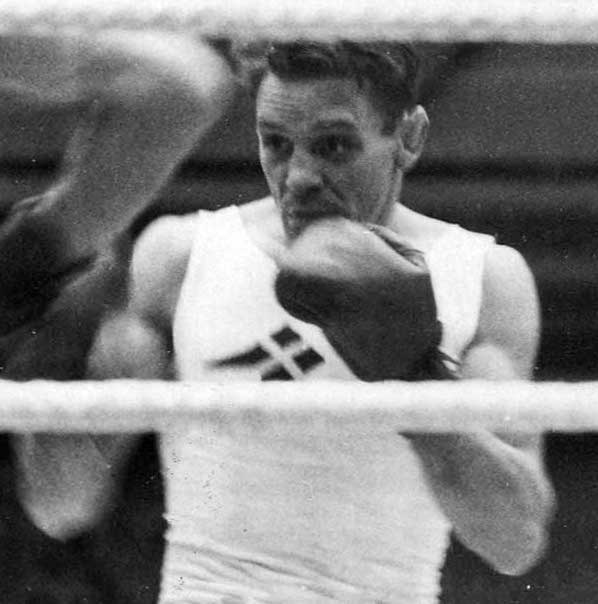

Personal information
- Born: 26 January 1908 Söderbykarl, Sweden
- Died: 2 September 1983 (aged 75) Enskede, Stockholm, Sweden

Sport
- Sport: Boxing
- Club: Hammarby IF
Medal record
Men's amateur boxing
Representing Sweden
Olympic Games
Bronze medal – third place	1928 Amsterdam	Lightweight
European Amateur Championships
Bronze medal – third place	1927 Berlin	Lightweight

Gunnar Alf Erik Berggren (26 January 1908 – 2 September 1983) was a Swedish boxer who won bronze medals in the lightweight division at the 1927 European Championships and 1928 Summer Olympics. After the Olympics he turned professional and had a record of 13 wins, 9 losses and 10 draws, before retiring in 1936. He competed for Hammarby IF throughout his whole career.

== 1928 Olympic results ==
Below is the record of Gunnar Berggren, a Swedish lightweight boxer who competed at the 1928 Amsterdam Olympics:

- Round of 32: defeated Pierre Godart (Belgium) on points
- Round of 16: defeated Robert Smith (South Africa) on points
- Quarterfinal: defeated Jorge Diaz (Chile) on points
- Semifinal: lost to Stephen Halaiko (United States) on points
- Bronze Medal Bout: defeated Hans Jacob Nielsen (Denmark) on points (was awarded bronze medal)
