= Jack Garland (boxer) =

Irish boxer (1908–1985)

Jack Garland (1 February 1908 – 29 November 1985) was a boxer born in Belfast, Northern Ireland.

== Boxing career ==
=== Amateur career ===
Garland won the 1928 Amateur Boxing Association British bantamweight title, when boxing out of the Gordon Highlanders BC.

He then represented Great Britain in the bantamweight class at the 1928 Summer Olympics. He was eliminated in the quarter-finals of the Games when he lost to that year's gold medalist Vittorio Tamagnini.

1928 Olympic results

- Round of 32: bye
- Round of 16: defeated Ernest Mignard (France) on points
- Quarterfinal: lost to Vittorio Tamagnini (Italy) on points

=== Professional career ===
He turned professional in January 1929 and won the Irish featherweight title in 1930. He had his last recorded pro fight in 1935. Notable opponents he met as a pro include Panama Al Brown, Nel Tarleton, Harry Mizler and Nipper Pat Daly.

== Sources ==
- Madden, Brian. Yesterday's Glovemen: The Golden Days of Ulster Boxing, The Brehon Press, 2006—ISBN 978-1-905474-02-8
