= János Széles =

Hungarian boxer

Personal information
- Nationality: Hungarian
- Born: 23 September 1907 Budapest, Austria-Hungary
- Died: 8 July 1981 (aged 73) Buenos Aires, Argentina

Sport
- Sport: Boxing
Medal record
Men's amateur boxing
Representing Hungary
European Amateur Championships
Gold medal – first place	1930 Budapest	Bantamweight

János Széles (23 September 1907 – 8 July 1981) was a Hungarian boxer. He competed in the men's bantamweight event at the 1928 Summer Olympics.
