= Harry Isaacs (boxer) =

South African boxer

Olympic medal record

Men's Boxing

Representing South Africa
| Bronze medal – third place | 1928 Amsterdam | Bantamweight |

Harry Isaacs (26 January 1908, in Johannesburg – 13 September 1961) was a South African boxer who competed in the 1928 Summer Olympics in Amsterdam.

Harry Isaacs

In his first Olympic bout, he defeated Aage Fahrenholtz of Denmark in a points decision. In his second Olympic bout, he defeated Canadian boxer Vince Glionna on points. In his third Olympic bout, he lost to John Daley of the United States on a points decision in the semi-final round.

In his last Olympic bout, he took the bronze medal in the bantamweight class after defeating Frank Traynor of Ireland in a points decision.

He died on 13 September 1961 in Johannesburg.

== 1928 Olympic results ==
Below is the complete record of Harry Isaacs, a South African bantamweight boxer who competed at the 1928 Amsterdam Olympics:

- Round of 32: bye
- Round of 16: defeated Aage Fahrenholtz (Denmark) on points
- Quarterfinal: defeated Vince Glionna (Canada) on points
- Semifinal: lost to John Daley (United States) on points
- Bronze Medal Bout: defeated Frank Traynor (Ireland) on points (was awarded bronze medal)
