= Frank Traynor (boxer) =

Irish boxer

Personal information
- Nationality: Irish
- Born: 2 June 1904; Dublin, Ireland
- Died: 23 February 1991 (aged 86)

Sport
- Sport: Boxing

Frank Traynor (2 June 1904 – 23 February 1991) was an Irish boxer. He competed in the men's bantamweight event at the 1928 Summer Olympics. He had a total of 4 career KO's.
