= Teddy Baldock =

English boxer

Personal information
- Nickname: The Pride of Poplar
- Nationality: English
- Born: Alfred Stephen Baldock; 24 May 1907 Poplar, London, England
- Died: 8 March 1971 (aged 63) Rochford, Essex, England
- Weight: bantam/feather/lightweight

Boxing career
- Stance: Orthodox

Boxing record
- Total fights: 85
- Wins: 76 (KO 38)
- Losses: 5 (KO 1)
- Draws: 4

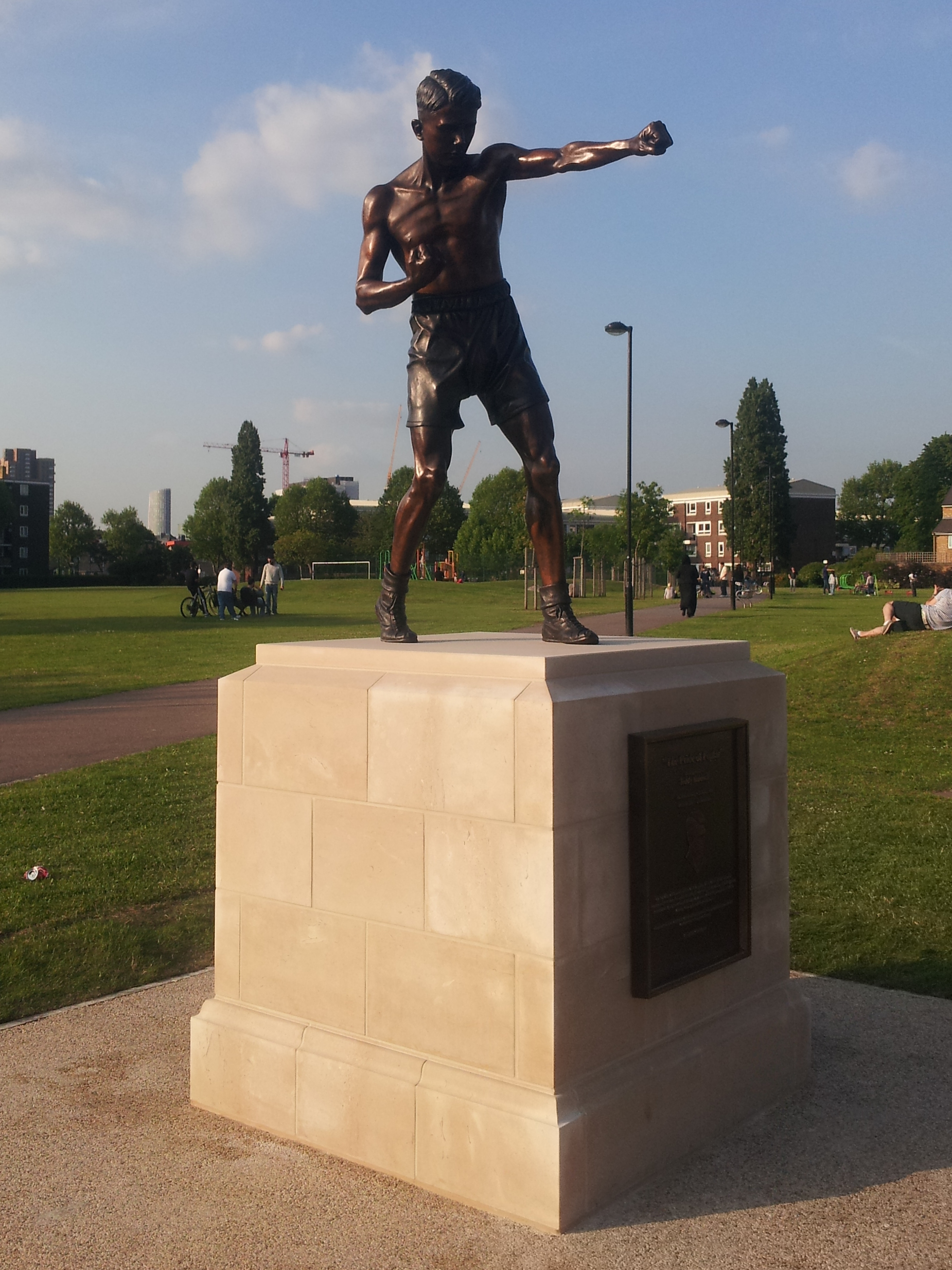
Statue of Teddy Baldock in Langdon Park, Poplar.

Teddy Baldock (24 May 1907 – 8 March 1971) was an English professional bantam/feather/lightweight boxer of the 1920s and 1930s. Born in Poplar, London, he was nicknamed "The Pride of Poplar".

Baldock won the National Sporting Club (NSC) (subsequently known as the British Boxing Board of Control (BBBofC)) British bantamweight title, British Empire bantamweight title, and World Bantamweight Title (British version), His professional fighting weight varied from 98 lb (44 kg; 7 st 0 lb), i.e. flyweight to 126 lb (57 kg; 9 st 0 lb), i.e. featherweight. He was managed by Joe Morris and Ted Broadribb.

== Legacy ==
In 2014 a bronze statue was erected in his memory at Langdon Park in Poplar, following a fundraising campaign led by his grandson. On 1 February 2026 the statue was stolen.
