= John Daley (boxer) =

American boxer

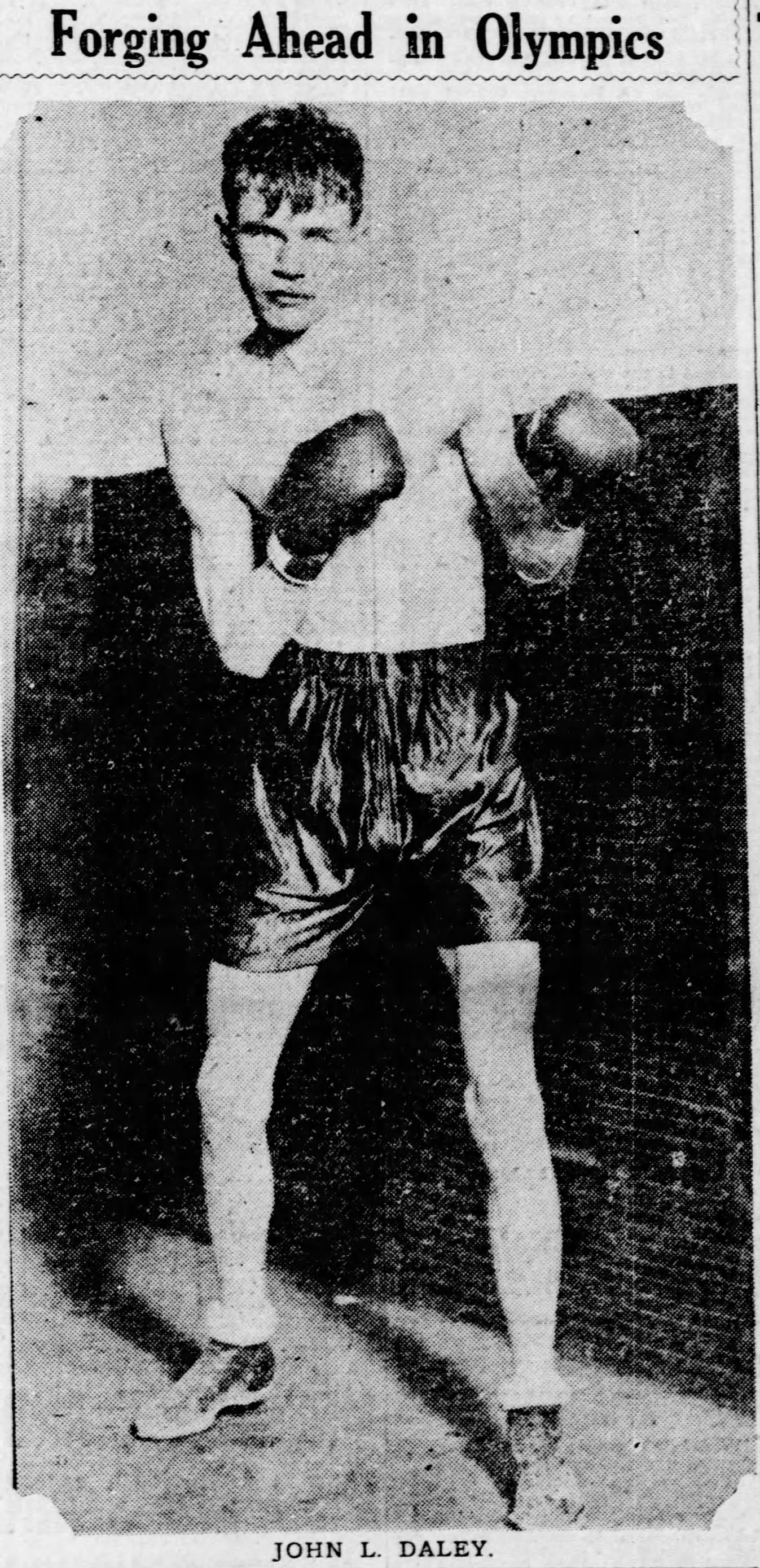
- Daley in 1928

Medal record

Men's boxing

Representing the United States

Olympic Games
Silver medal – second place	1928 Amsterdam	Bantamweight

John Lawrence Daley (August 26, 1909 in Newton, Massachusetts – February 7, 1963) was an American boxer who competed in the 1928 Summer Olympics.

== Amateur career ==
Daley won the National AAU bantamweight title in 1928. Later that year Daley won the silver medal in the bantamweight class in the 1928 Olympics after losing the final to Vittorio Tamagnini of Italy.

== Olympic record ==
John Daley competed for the United States in the 1928 Amsterdam Olympic boxing tournament. He competed in the bantamweight division. Here is his record from that tournament:

- Round of 32: defeated Ingvald Bjerke (Norway) on points
- Round of 16: defeated Osvaldo Sanchez (Chile) on points
- Quarterfinal: defeated Janos Szeles (Hungary) on points
- Semifinal: defeated Harry Isaacs (South Africa) on points
- Final: lost to Vittorio Tamagnini (Italy) on points (was awarded the silver medal)
