= Weightlifting at the 1928 Summer Olympics – Men's 60 kg =

1928 Featherweight weightlifting at the Olympics

Men's featherweight weightlifting at the Games of the IX Olympiad
- Date: 28 July
- Competitors: 21 from 13 nations

Medalists
1st place, gold medalist(s)		Franz Andrysek	Austria
2nd place, silver medalist(s)		Pierino Gabetti	Italy
3rd place, bronze medalist(s)		Hans Wölpert	Germany

The men's featherweight event was part of the weightlifting programme at the 1928 Summer Olympics in Amsterdam. The weight class was the lightest contested, and allowed weightlifters of up to 60 kilograms (132 pounds). The competition was held on Saturday, 28 July 1928.

== Records ==
These were the standing world and Olympic records (in kilograms) prior to the 1928 Summer Olympics.

World Record	Press	92.5	(Germany) Hans Wölpert	Mannheim (GER)	1924
World Record	Snatch	92.5	(Italy) Pierino Gabetti	Milan (ITA)	1927
World Record	Clean & Jerk	120	(Austria) Andreas Stadler	Vienna (AUT)	1926
World Record	Total	282.5	(Switzerland) Heinrich Graf	Tallinn (EST)	April 1922
Olympic Record	Press	80	(Switzerland) Arthur Reinmann	Paris (FRA)	21 July 1924
Olympic Record	Snatch	82.5	(Italy) Pierino Gabetti	Paris (FRA)	21 July 1924
Olympic Record	Snatch	82.5	(France) Maurice Martin	Paris (FRA)	21 July 1924
Olympic Record	Clean & Jerk	105	(Italy) Pierino Gabetti	Paris (FRA)	21 July 1924
Olympic Record	Clean & Jerk	105	(Austria) Andreas Stadler	Paris (FRA)	21 July 1924
Olympic Record	Clean & Jerk	105	(Austria) Wilhelm Rosinek	Paris (FRA)	21 July 1924
Olympic Record	Clean & Jerk	105	(United Kingdom) Alfred Baxter	Paris (FRA)	21 July 1924
Olympic Record	Total	260(*)	(Italy) Pierino Gabetti	Paris (FRA)	21 July 1924

(*) Originally a five lift competition.

All four Olympic records were improved in this competition. Hans Wölpert and Giuseppe Conca in press and Franz Andrysek in clean and jerk equalized the standing world records. Pierino Gabetti and Hans Wölpert equalized the standing world record in the three lifts (total) while Franz Andrysek set a new world record with 287.5 kilograms.

== Results ==
All figures in kilograms.

Rank	Weightlifter	Nation	Press				Snatch				Clean & jerk				Total
Rank	Weightlifter	Nation	1	2	3	Result	1	2	3	Result	1	2	3	Result	Total
1st place, gold medalist(s)	Franz Andrysek	Austria	70	~~75~~	77.5	77.5	85	90	-	90	115	120	~~122.5~~	120	287.5
2nd place, silver medalist(s)	Pierino Gabetti	Italy	72.5	77.5	80	80	82.5	85	90	90	107.5	112.5	~~115~~	112.5	282.5
3rd place, bronze medalist(s)	Hans Wölpert	Germany	87.5	92.5	-	92.5	77.5	82.5	-	82.5	107.5	~~112.5~~	~~112.5~~	107.5	282.5
4	Giuseppe Conca	Italy	85	90	92.5	92.5	75	80	-	80	105	-	~~112.5~~	105	277.5
5	Arthur Reinmann	Switzerland	75	80	82.5	82.5	72.5	77.5	82.5	82.5	100	105	110	110	275
6	Andreas Stadler	Austria	67.5	72.5	~~75~~	72.5	80	-	-	80	~~115~~	~~115~~	115	115	267.5
7	Henri Baudrand	France	72.5	77.5	-	77.5	~~80~~	80	-	80	102.5	~~107.5~~	107.5	107.5	265
8	Josef Vacek	Czechoslovakia	75	~~80~~	80	80	75	80	82.5	82.5	-	100	-	100	262.5
8	Cemal Erçman	Turkey	80	85	-	85	67.5	75	-	75	95	100	102.5	102.5	262.5
10	Henri Rivière	France	62.5	67.5	70	70	80	85	-	85	102.5	107.5	~~112.5~~	107.5	260
11	Ferdinand Renier	Belgium	65	70	72.5	72.5	~~77.5~~	~~77.5~~	77.5	77.5	97.5	102.5	105	105	255
11	Eugen Mühlberger	Germany	70	-	-	70	80	-	-	80	~~105~~	105	~~110~~	105	255
11	António Pereira	Portugal	65	70	~~72.5~~	70	75	~~80~~	80	80	100	~~105~~	105	105	255
14	Justin Tissot	Switzerland	65	70	72.5	72.5	~~77.5~~	77.5	-	77.5	95	100	-	100	250
14	Aleksander Kask	Estonia	~~75~~	75	-	75	-	75	-	75	-	100	-	100	250
16	Hendrik de Wolf	Netherlands	67.5	72.5	~~75~~	72.5	75	-	-	75	~~100~~	100	-	100	247.5
16	Albert Maes	Belgium	72.5	-	-	72.5	~~75~~	~~75~~	75	75	-	100	-	100	247.5
18	Alfred Baxter	Great Britain	67.5	72.5	75	75	~~67.5~~	67.5	-	67.5	92.5	97.5	-	97.5	240
19	Cornelis Compter	Netherlands	70	75	-	75	70	~~75~~	~~75~~	70	92.5	-	-	92.5	237.5
20	Alfred Hopkins	Great Britain	60	~~65~~	~~65~~	60	67.5	72.5	-	72.5	~~90~~	95	-	95	227.5
21	Casimiro Vega	Argentina	60	~~65~~	~~65~~	60	67.5	-	-	67.5	90	95	-	95	222.5

== Sources ==
- Olympic Report
- Wudarski, Pawel (1999). "Wyniki Igrzysk Olimpijskich" (in Polish).
