= Weightlifting at the 1932 Summer Olympics – Men's 60 kg =

Weightlifting at the Olympics

The men's featherweight event was part of the weightlifting programme at the 1932 Summer Olympics in Los Angeles. The weight class was the lightest contested, and allowed weightlifters of up to 60 kilograms (132 pounds). The competition was held on Sunday, 31 July 1932. Six weightlifters from four nations competed.

== Medalists ==
Gold	Silver	Bronze
Raymond Suvigny; France	Hans Wölpert; Germany	Anthony Terlazzo; United States

== Records ==
These were the standing world and Olympic records (in kilograms) prior to the 1932 Summer Olympics.

World Record	Press	92.5	(Germany) Hans Wölpert	Mannheim (GER)	1924
World Record	Press	92.5	(Germany) Hans Wölpert	Amsterdam (NED)	28 July 1928
World Record	Press	92.5	(Italy) Giuseppe Conca	Amsterdam (NED)	28 July 1928
World Record	Snatch	95.5	(Austria) Franz Janisch	Vienna (AUT)	1931
World Record	Clean & Jerk	>122	?		
World Record	Total	287.5	(Austria) Franz Andrysek	Amsterdam (NED)	28 July 1928
World Record	Total	287.5	(Germany) Hans Wölpert	Breslau (GER)	1930
Olympic Record	Press	92.5	(Germany) Hans Wölpert	Amsterdam (NED)	28 July 1928
Olympic Record	Press	92.5	(Italy) Giuseppe Conca	Amsterdam (NED)	28 July 1928
Olympic Record	Snatch	90	(Austria) Franz Andrysek	Amsterdam (NED)	28 July 1928
Olympic Record	Snatch	90	(Italy) Pierino Gabetti	Amsterdam (NED)	28 July 1928
Olympic Record	Clean & Jerk	120	(Austria) Franz Andrysek	Amsterdam (NED)	28 July 1928
Olympic Record	Total	287.5	(Austria) Franz Andrysek	Amsterdam (NED)	28 July 1928

No world or Olympic record was bettered at this Games. Raymond Suvigny equalized the standing world record in total with 287.5 kilograms.

== Results ==
All figures in kilograms.

Place	Weightlifter	Press			Snatch			Clean & jerk			Total
Place	Weightlifter	1.	2.	3.	1.	2.	3.	1.	2.	3.	Total
1	Raymond Suvigny (FRA)	75	80	82.5	80	85	87.5	107.5	112.5	117.5	287.5
2	Hans Wölpert (GER)	X (85)	85	X (87.5)	80	85	87.5	105	X (110)	110	282.5
3	Anthony Terlazzo (USA)	77.5	82.5	X (85)	80	85	X (87.5)	107.5	112.5	X (117.5)	280
4	Helmut Schäfer (GER)	72.5	77.5	X (80)	77.5	X (82.5)	X (85)	112.5	X (120)	X (120)	267.5
5	Attilio Bescapè (ITA)	77.5	82.5	X (85)	77.5	X (82.5)	X (82.5)	X (102.5)	102.5	-	262.5
6	Richard Bachtell (USA)	70	X (75)	X (75)	75	80	X (82.5)	102.5	X (107.5)	X (107.5)	252.5

== Sources ==
- Olympic Report
- Wudarski, Pawel (1999). "Wyniki Igrzysk Olimpijskich" (in Polish).
