= Weightlifting at the 1924 Summer Olympics – Men's 60 kg =

Men's featherweight weightlifting at the Games of the VIII Olympiad
- Venue: Olympisch Stadion
- Date: 21 July
- Competitors: 21 from 11 nations

Medalists
1st place, gold medalist(s)		Pierino Gabetti	Italy
2nd place, silver medalist(s)		Andreas Stadler	Austria
3rd place, bronze medalist(s)		Arthur Reinmann	Switzerland

The men's featherweight event was part of the weightlifting programme at the 1924 Summer Olympics in Paris. The weight class was the lightest contested, and allowed weightlifters of up to 60 kilograms (132 pounds). The competition was held on 21 July 1924.

== Results ==
One hand snatch

Place	Weightlifter	Body weight	one hand snatch		
Place	Weightlifter	Body weight	1.	2.	3.
1	Andreas Stadler (AUT)	59.0	60	65	X (67.5)
2	Pierino Gabetti (ITA)	59.3	60	X (65)	65
3	Maurice Martin (FRA)	58.7	55	60	X (62.5)
4	Franz Andrysek (AUT)	59.0	55	X (60)	60
5	Gustav Ernesaks (EST)	59.8	55	60	X (62.5)
6	Antonín Hrabě (TCH)	58.7	52.5	57.5	X (60)
7	Arthur Reinmann (SUI)	59.2	50	55	57.5
7	Wilhelm Rosinek (AUT)	59.2	52.5	57.5	X (60)
9	Rodolphe Catalaa (FRA)	56.8	X (55)	X (55)	55
10	Nicolaas Moerloos (BEL)	58.3	X (55)	55	X (60)
10	Sante Scarcia (ITA)	58.3	55	X (60)	X (60)
12	Albert Maes (BEL)	58.7	55	X (60)	X (60)
13	Edgar Juillerat (SUI)	59.0	55	X (60)	X (60)
14	Alfred Baxter (GBR)	59.5	50	55	X (60)
14	Augustus Cummins (GBR)	59.5	50	55	X (57.5)
16	António Pereira (POR)		55	-	-
16	Sigfrid Hylander (SWE)		55	-	-
18	Cemal Erçman (TUR)	58.5	50	X (55)	X (57.5)
19	Raymond Suvigny (FRA)	59.0	50	X (55)	X (55)
20	Thomas Taylor (GBR)	59.5	X (50)	X (50)	50
-	Giuseppe Conca (ITA)	56.4	X (55)	X (55)	-

One hand clean & jerk

Place	Weightlifter	Body weight	one hand snatch	one hand clean & jerk			Total
Place	Weightlifter	Body weight	one hand snatch	1.	2.	3.	Total
1	Pierino Gabetti (ITA)	59.3	65	70	75	77.5	142.5
2	Andreas Stadler (AUT)	59.0	65	70	X (75)	75	140
3	Gustav Ernesaks (EST)	59.8	60	72.5	77.5	80	140
4	Antonín Hrabě (TCH)	58.7	57.5	72.5	77.5	80	137.5
5	Franz Andrysek (AUT)	59.0	60	70	75	X (80)	135
6	Wilhelm Rosinek (AUT)	59.2	57.5	X (70)	70	75	132.5
7	Arthur Reinmann (SUI)	59.2	57.5	70	X (75)	X (75)	127.5
8	Rodolphe Catalaa (FRA)	56.8	55	65	70	X (75)	125
9	Nicolaas Moerloos (BEL)	58.3	55	65	70	X (75)	125
10	Albert Maes (BEL)	58.7	55	X (70)	70	X (75)	125
11	Edgar Juillerat (SUI)	59.0	55	65	70	X (75)	125
12	Maurice Martin (FRA)	58.7	60	X (57.5)	57.5	62.5	122.5
13	Sante Scarcia (ITA)	58.3	55	60	65	X (70)	120
14	Alfred Baxter (GBR)	59.5	55	60	65	X (67.5)	120
14	Augustus Cummins (GBR)	59.5	55	60	65	X (67.5)	120
16	António Pereira (POR)		55	60	65	-	120
17	Raymond Suvigny (FRA)	59.0	50	60	X (65)	65	115
18	Cemal Erçman (TUR)	58.5	50	55	60	X (65)	110
19	Thomas Taylor (GBR)	59.5	50	55	X (60)	X (60)	105
20	Giuseppe Conca (ITA)	56.4	0	45	50	X (55)	50
-	Sigfrid Hylander (SWE)		55	-	-	-	DNF

Press

Place	Weightlifter	Body weight	one hand snatch	one hand clean & jerk	Press			Total
Place	Weightlifter	Body weight	one hand snatch	one hand clean & jerk	1.	2.	3.	Total
1	Pierino Gabetti (ITA)	59.3	65	77.5	65	70	72.5	215
2	Gustav Ernesaks (EST)	59.8	60	80	60	65	67.5	207.5
3	Arthur Reinmann (SUI)	59.2	57.5	70	75	80	X (82.5)	207.5
4	Andreas Stadler (AUT)	59.0	65	75	65	X (70)	X (70)	205
5	Franz Andrysek (AUT)	59.0	60	75	62.5	67.5	X (70)	202.5
6	Antonín Hrabě (TCH)	58.7	57.5	80	57.5	X (62.5)	62.5	200
7	Wilhelm Rosinek (AUT)	59.2	57.5	75	62.5	67.5	X (70)	200
8	Maurice Martin (FRA)	58.7	60	62.5	70	75	X (77.5)	197.5
9	Rodolphe Catalaa (FRA)	56.8	55	70	70	X (72.5)	-	195
10	Edgar Juillerat (SUI)	59.0	55	70	67.5	X (72.5)	X (72.5)	192.5
11	Nicolaas Moerloos (BEL)	58.3	55	70	X (65)	65	X (67.5)	190
11	Sante Scarcia (ITA)	58.3	55	65	65	70	X (72.5)	190
13	Cemal Erçman (TUR)	58.5	50	60	75	80	X (82.5)	190
14	Albert Maes (BEL)	58.7	55	70	X (65)	65	X (67.5)	190
15	Alfred Baxter (GBR)	59.5	55	65	65	X (70)	70	190
16	António Pereira (POR)		55	65	-	60	65	185
17	Raymond Suvigny (FRA)	59.0	50	65	65	70	X (72.5)	185
18	Augustus Cummins (GBR)	59.5	55	65	X (62.5)	62.5	X (67.5)	182.5
19	Thomas Taylor (GBR)	59.5	50	55	X (57.5)	X (57.5)	57.5	162.5
20	Giuseppe Conca (ITA)	56.4	0	50	70	75	X (80)	125
-	Sigfrid Hylander (SWE)		55	0	-	-	-	DNF

Two hand snatch

Place	Weightlifter	Body weight	one hand snatch	one hand clean & jerk	Press	Snatch			Total
Place	Weightlifter	Body weight	one hand snatch	one hand clean & jerk	Press	1.	2.	3.	Total
1	Pierino Gabetti (ITA)	59.3	65	77.5	72.5	75	80	82.5	297.5
2	Arthur Reinmann (SUI)	59.2	57.5	70	80	75	X (80)	X (80)	282.5
3	Maurice Martin (FRA)	58.7	60	62.5	75	75	80	82.5	280
4	Andreas Stadler (AUT)	59.0	65	75	65	75	X (80)	X (80)	280
5	Gustav Ernesaks (EST)	59.8	60	80	67.5	72.5	X (77.5)	X (77.5)	280
6	Franz Andrysek (AUT)	59.0	60	75	67.5	72.5	X (77.5)	X (77.5)	275
7	Antonín Hrabě (TCH)	58.7	57.5	80	62.5	62.5	67.5	70	270
8	Wilhelm Rosinek (AUT)	59.2	57.5	75	67.5	62.5	67.5	70	270
9	Edgar Juillerat (SUI)	59.0	55	70	67.5	70	75	X (77.5)	267.5
10	Rodolphe Catalaa (FRA)	56.8	55	70	70	70	X (75)	X (75)	265
11	Raymond Suvigny (FRA)	59.0	50	65	70	72.5	77.5	80	265
12	Alfred Baxter (GBR)	59.5	55	65	70	70	X (75)	75	265
13	Nicolaas Moerloos (BEL)	58.3	55	70	65	67.5	X (72.5)	X (72.5)	257.5
14	Albert Maes (BEL)	58.7	55	70	65	67.5	X (72.5)	X (72.5)	257.5
15	Cemal Erçman (TUR)	58.5	50	60	80	65	X (70)	X (70)	255
16	Sante Scarcia (ITA)	58.3	55	65	70	62.5	X (67.5)	X (67.5)	252.5
17	Augustus Cummins (GBR)	59.5	55	65	62.5	62.5	67.5	X (70)	250
18	Thomas Taylor (GBR)	59.5	50	55	57.5	65	X (70)	X (70)	227.5
19	Giuseppe Conca (ITA)	56.4	0	50	75	55	65	X (70)	190
-	António Pereira (POR)		55	65	65	-	-	-	DNF
-	Sigfrid Hylander (SWE)		55	0	0	-	-	-	DNF

Two hand clean & jerk

Final standing after the last event:

Place	Weightlifter	Body weight	one hand snatch	one hand clean & jerk	Press	Snatch	Clean & jerk			Total
Place	Weightlifter	Body weight	one hand snatch	one hand clean & jerk	Press	Snatch	1.	2.	3.	Total
1	Pierino Gabetti (ITA)	59.3	65	77.5	72.5	82.5	100	105	X (108.5)	402.5
2	Andreas Stadler (AUT)	59.0	65	75	65	75	X (105)	105	X (110)	385
3	Arthur Reinmann (SUI)	59.2	57.5	70	80	75	X (100)	100	X (105)	382.5
4	Maurice Martin (FRA)	58.7	60	62.5	75	82.5	95	100	X (105)	380
5	Wilhelm Rosinek (AUT)	59.2	57.5	75	67.5	70	X (100)	100	105	375
6	Gustav Ernesaks (EST)	59.8	60	80	67.5	72.5	92.5	X (97.5)	X (97.5)	372.5
7	Alfred Baxter (GBR)	59.5	55	65	70	75	100	X (105)	105	370
8	Edgar Juillerat (SUI)	59.0	55	70	67.5	75	95	100	X (105)	367.5
9	Antonín Hrabě (TCH)	58.7	57.5	80	62.5	70	95	X (100)	X (100)	365
10	Raymond Suvigny (FRA)	59.0	50	65	70	80	95	X (100)	100	365
11	Rodolphe Catalaa (FRA)	56.8	55	70	70	70	90	95	X (100)	360
12	Nicolaas Moerloos (BEL)	58.3	55	75	65	67.5	X (92.5)	X (92.5)	92.5	355
13	Albert Maes (BEL)	58.7	55	70	65	67.5	X (95)	95	X (100)	352.5
14	Cemal Erçman (TUR)	58.5	50	60	80	65	X (90)	90	X (95)	345
15	Sante Scarcia (ITA)	58.3	55	65	70	62.5	85	X (90)	90	342.5
16	Augustus Cummins (GBR)	59.5	55	65	62.5	67.5	82.5	87.5	X (90)	337.5
17	Thomas Taylor (GBR)	59.5	50	55	57.5	65	X (85)	90	X (92.5)	317.5
18	Giuseppe Conca (ITA)	56.4	NM	50	75	65	80	X (85)	85	275
19	Franz Andrysek (AUT)	59.0	60	75	67.5	72.5	X (100)	X (100)	X (100)	275
-	António Pereira (POR)		55	65	65	-	-	-	-	DNF
-	Sigfrid Hylander (SWE)		55	-	-	-	-	-	-	DNF

== Sources ==
- official report
- Wudarski, Pawel (1999). "Wyniki Igrzysk Olimpijskich" (in Polish).
