= Nicholas Williams =

Nicholas, Neco, Nico or Nick Williams may refer to:

== Sportsmen ==
- Nick Williams (fullback) (born 1977), American NFL football player, a/k/a Nick Luchey
- Nick Williams (rugby union) (born 1983), New Zealand rugby league and rugby union player
- Nick Williams (defensive lineman) (born 1990), American NFL football player
- Nick Williams (wide receiver) (born 1990), American NFL football player
- Nick Williams (baseball) (born 1993), American outfielder
- Neco Williams (born 2001), Welsh footballer
- Nico Williams (born 2002), Spanish footballer

== Writers ==
- Nick Boddie Williams (1906–1992), American newspaper editor and author, a/k/a Nick B. Williams
- Nicholas Williams (poet) (born 1942), English writer in Cornish, a/k/a N. J. A. Williams
- Nicholas Sims-Williams (born 1949), English scholar of Central Asian history
- Nicholas Duncan-Williams (born 1957), Ghanaian religious leader and author
- Nick Williams (academic), English professor of enterprise at Leeds since 2015

== Others ==
- Sir Nicholas Williams, 1st Baronet (1681–1745), British Member of Parliament
- Nicholas Charles Williams (born 1961), English painter and draughtsman
- Nico Williams (artist) (born 1989), First Nation Canadian artist

== See also ==
- Williams (surname)
