= Tom Taylor (weightlifter) =

British weightlifter

Personal information
- Nationality: British
- Born: 26 July 1889
- Died: 21 July 1966 (aged 76)

Sport
- Sport: Weightlifting

Tom Taylor (26 July 1889 – 21 July 1966) was a British weightlifter. He competed in the men's featherweight event at the 1924 Summer Olympics.

== Biography ==
Tom Taylor triumphed in the featherweight division in the 1922 British Championship. He broke numerous British records and, in 1924, at the Stadium Club in London, won the world record for the two-handed dead lift with a lift of 435 lb (197 kg).

Taylor was the third British competitor in the men's featherweight division alongside Alfred Baxter and Augustus Cummins at the 1924 Olympics in Paris. He placed 17th overall, behind Baxter (7th) and Cummins (16th).

Despite having his given name listed as "Thomas Taylor," numerous official records show that it was actually "Tom".
