= List of Olympic venues in wrestling =

For the Summer Olympics, there are 29 venues that have been or will be used for wrestling.

Games	Venue	Other sports hosted at venues for those games	Capacity	Ref.
1896 Athens	Panathinaiko Stadium	Athletics, Gymnastics, Weightlifting	80,000	
1904 St. Louis	Francis Field	Archery, Athletics, Cycling, Football, Gymnastics, Lacrosse, Roque, Tennis, Tug of war, Weightlifting	19,000.	
1908 London	White City Stadium	Archery, Athletics, Cycling (track), Diving, Field hockey, Football, Gymnastics, Lacrosse, Rugby union, Swimming, Tug of war, Water polo (final)	97,000.	
1912 Stockholm	Stockholm Olympic Stadium	Athletics, Equestrian, Football (final), Gymnastics, Modern pentathlon (running), Tug of war	33,000.	
1920 Antwerp	Antwerp Zoo	Boxing	Not listed.	
1924 Paris	Vélodrome d'hiver	Boxing, Cycling (track), Fencing, Weightlifting	10,884	
1928 Amsterdam	Krachtsportgebouw	Boxing, Weightlifting	2,840	
1932 Los Angeles	Olympic Auditorium	Boxing, Weightlifting	10,000.	
1936 Berlin	Deutschlandhalle	Boxing, Weightlifting	8,630	
1948 London	Empress Hall, Earl's Court	Boxing, Gymnastics, Weightlifting	19,000	
1948 London	Harringay Arena	Basketball	Not listed.	
1952 Helsinki	Messuhalli	Basketball (final), Boxing, Gymnastics, Weightlifting	5,500	
1956 Melbourne	Royal Exhibition Building	Basketball (final), Modern pentathlon (fencing), Weightlifting	3,500	
1960 Rome	Basilica of Maxentius	None	5,402	
1964 Tokyo	Komazawa Gymnasium	None	3,900	
1968 Mexico City	Insurgentes Ice Rink	None	3,386	
1972 Munich	Messegelände, Judo- und Ringerhalle	Judo	5,750	
1976 Montreal	Centre Pierre Charbonneau	None	2,700	
1976 Montreal	Maurice Richard Arena	Boxing	4,750	
1980 Moscow	CSKA Athletics Fieldhouse	None	8,500	
1984 Los Angeles	Anaheim Convention Center	None	7,200	
1988 Seoul	Sangmu Gymnasium	None	5,000	
1992 Barcelona	Institut National d'Educació Física de Catalunya	None	400	
1996 Atlanta	Georgia World Congress Center	Fencing, Handball, Judo, Modern pentathlon (fencing, shooting), Table tennis, Weightlifting	3,900 (fencing); 7,300 (handball); 7,300 (judo); 4,700 (table tennis); 5,000 (weightlifting); 7,300 (wrestling)	
2000 Sydney	Sydney Convention and Exhibition Centre	Boxing, Fencing, Judo, Weightlifting	7,500 (weightlifting), 9,000 (judo & wrestling), 10,000 (boxing & fencing)	
2004 Athens	Ano Liosia Olympic Hall	Judo	10,000	
2008 Beijing	China Agricultural University Gymnasium	None	8,000	
2012 London	ExCeL	Boxing, Fencing, Judo, Table tennis, Taekwondo, Weightlifting	Not listed.	
2016 Rio de Janeiro	Carioca Arena 2	Judo	10,000	
2020 Tokyo	Makuhari Messe	Fencing, Taekwondo	8,000	
2024 Paris	Grand Palais Éphémère	Judo	8,000	
2028 Los Angeles	Los Angeles Convention Center	Fencing, Judo, Table tennis, Taekwondo	Not listed.	
2032 Brisbane	Gold Coast Sports and Leisure Centre	Judo	7,500	

== Gallery of venues ==
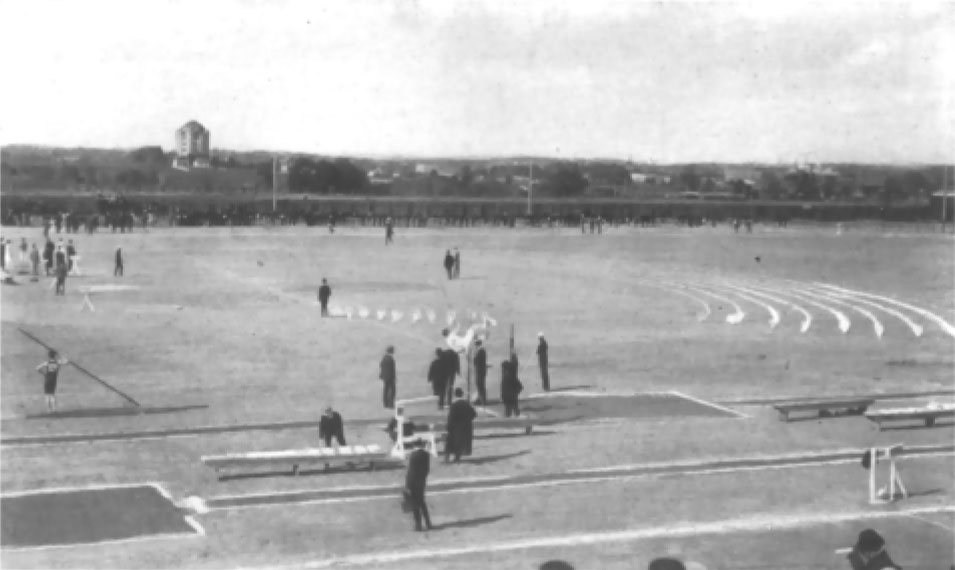
Francis Field hosted wrestling at the 1904 Summer Olympics in St. Louis.

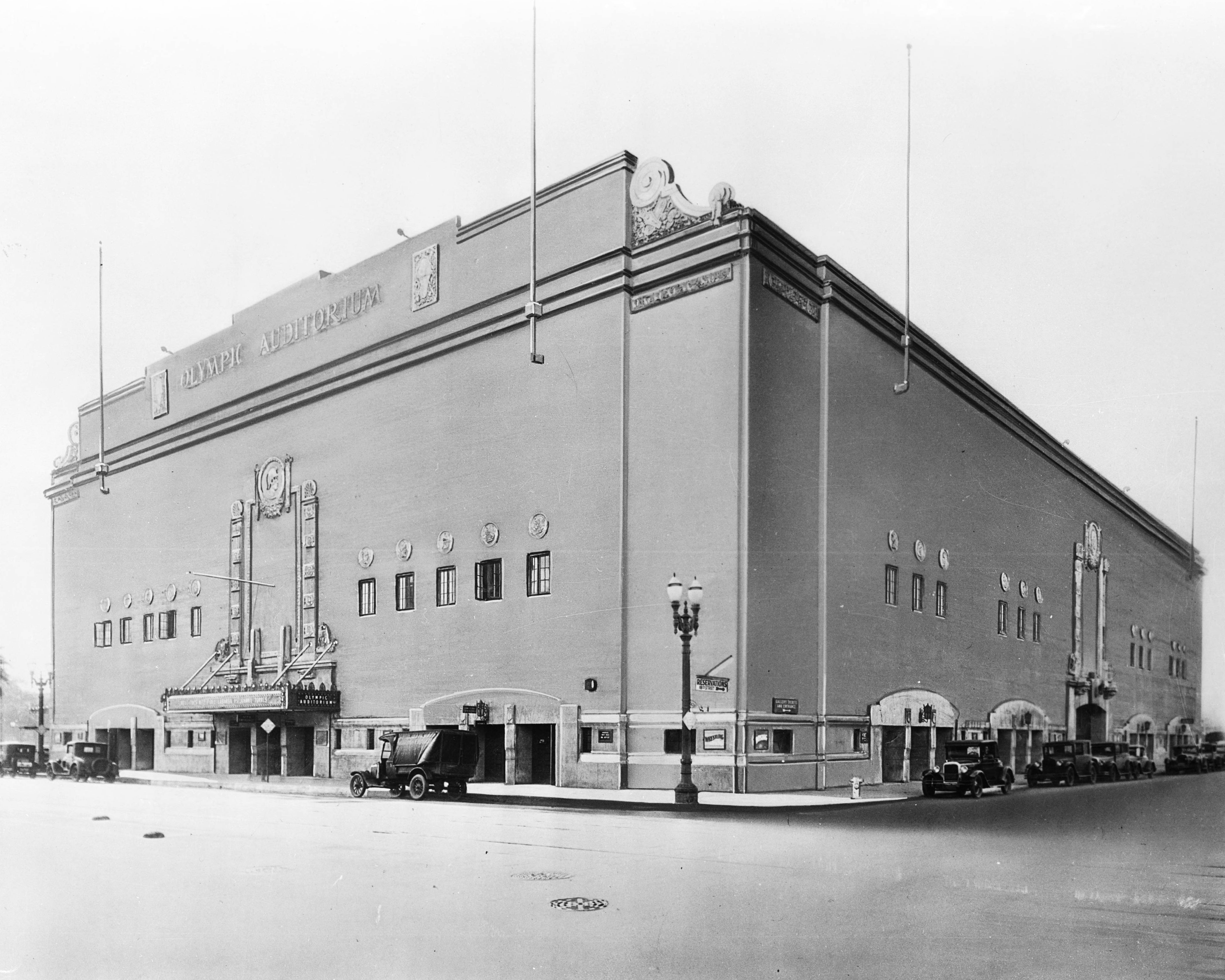
Grand Olympic Auditorium hosted wrestling at the 1932 Summer Olympics in Los Angeles.

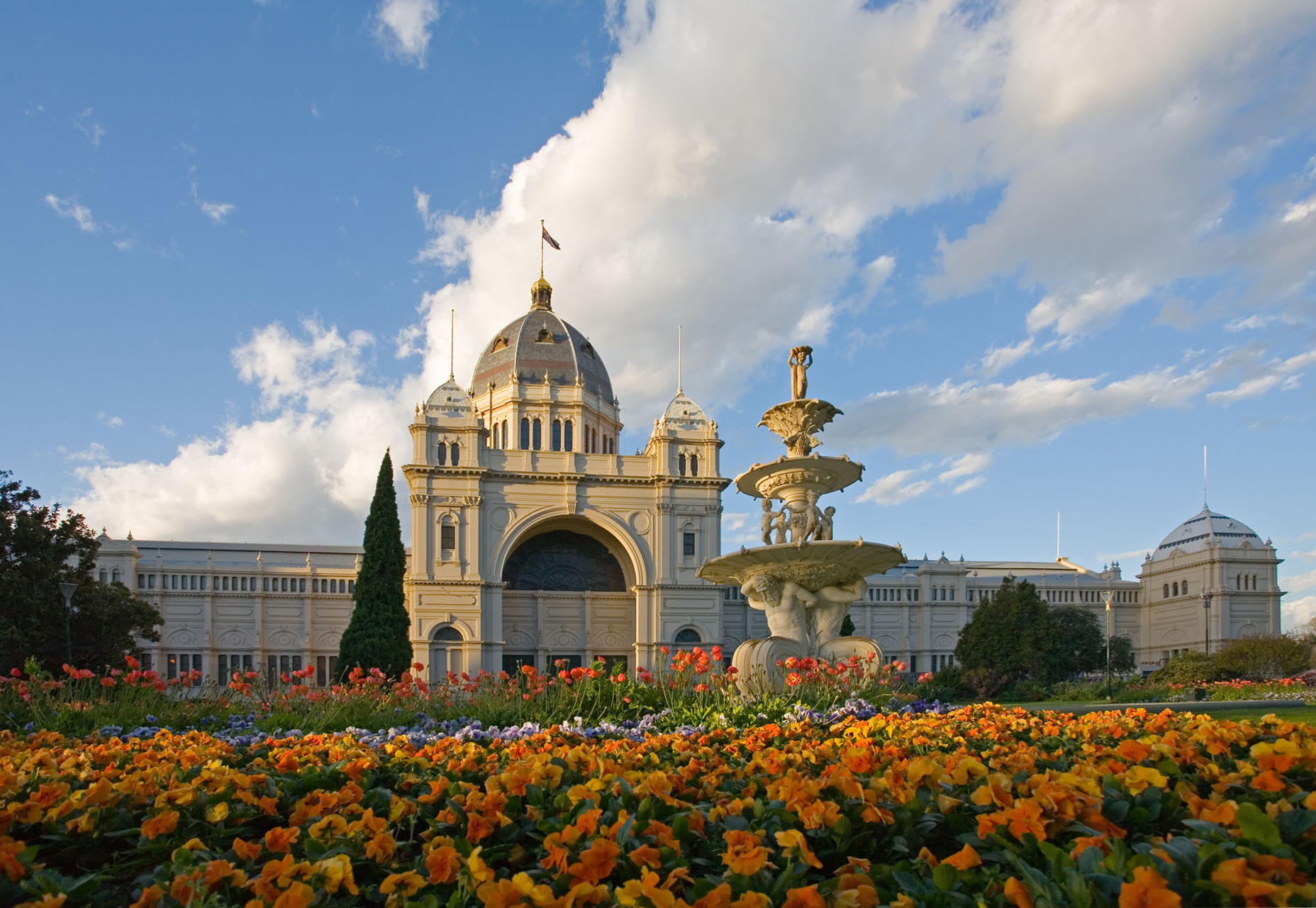
The Royal Exhibition Building hosted wrestling at the 1956 Summer Olympics in Melbourne.

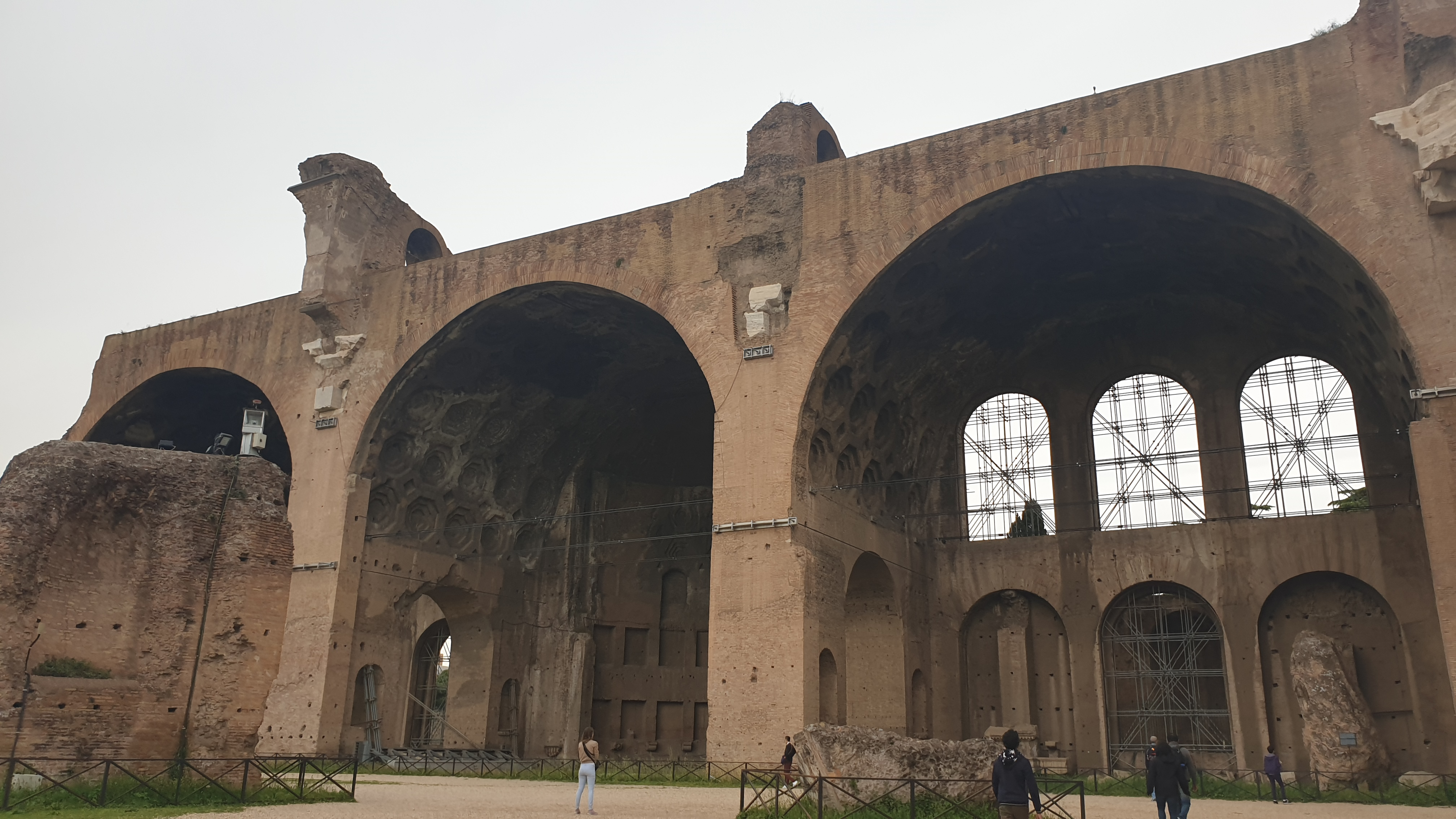
Basilica of Maxentius hosted wrestling at the 1960 Summer Olympics in Rome.

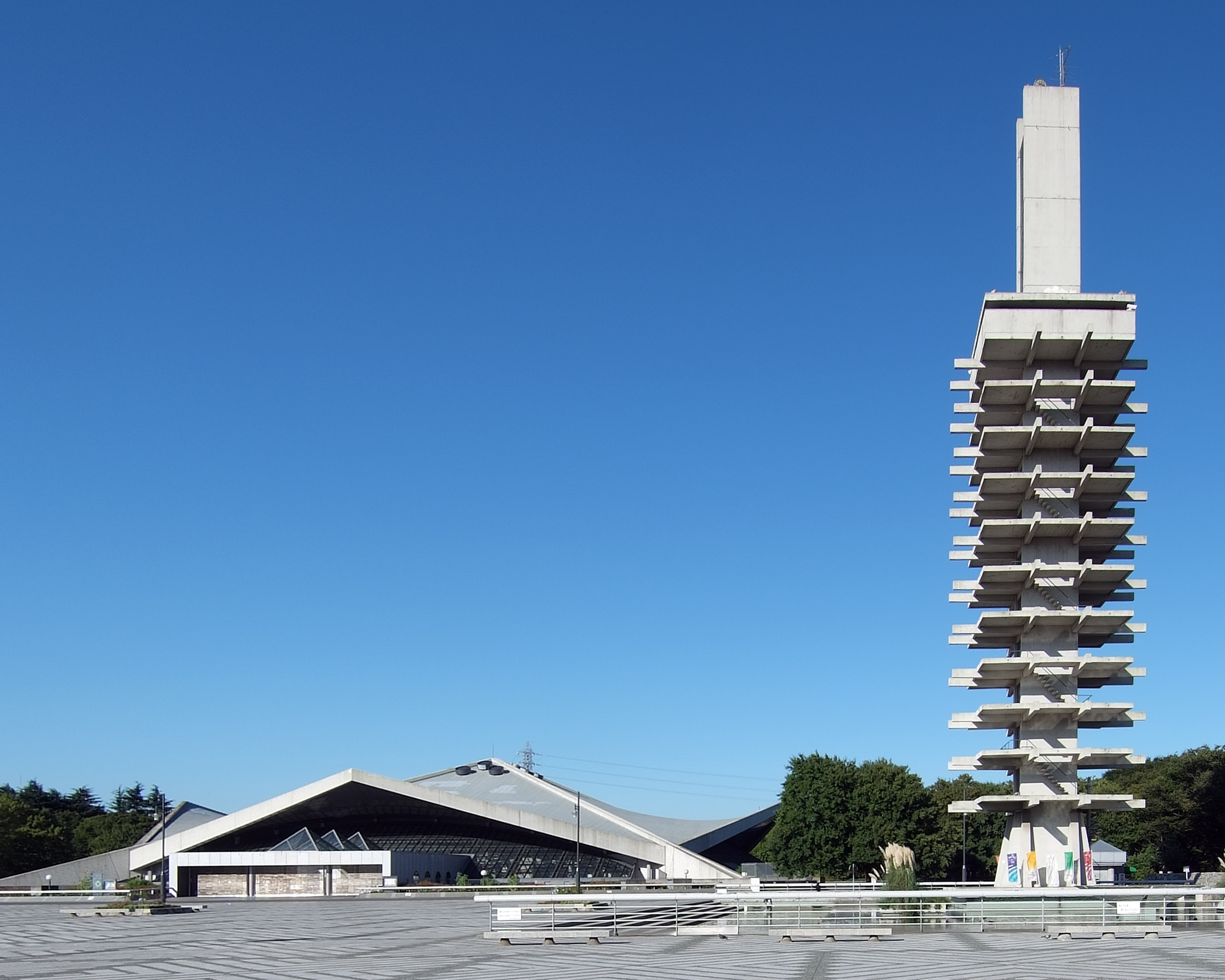
Komazawa Gymnasium hosted wrestling at the 1964 Summer Olympics in Tokyo.

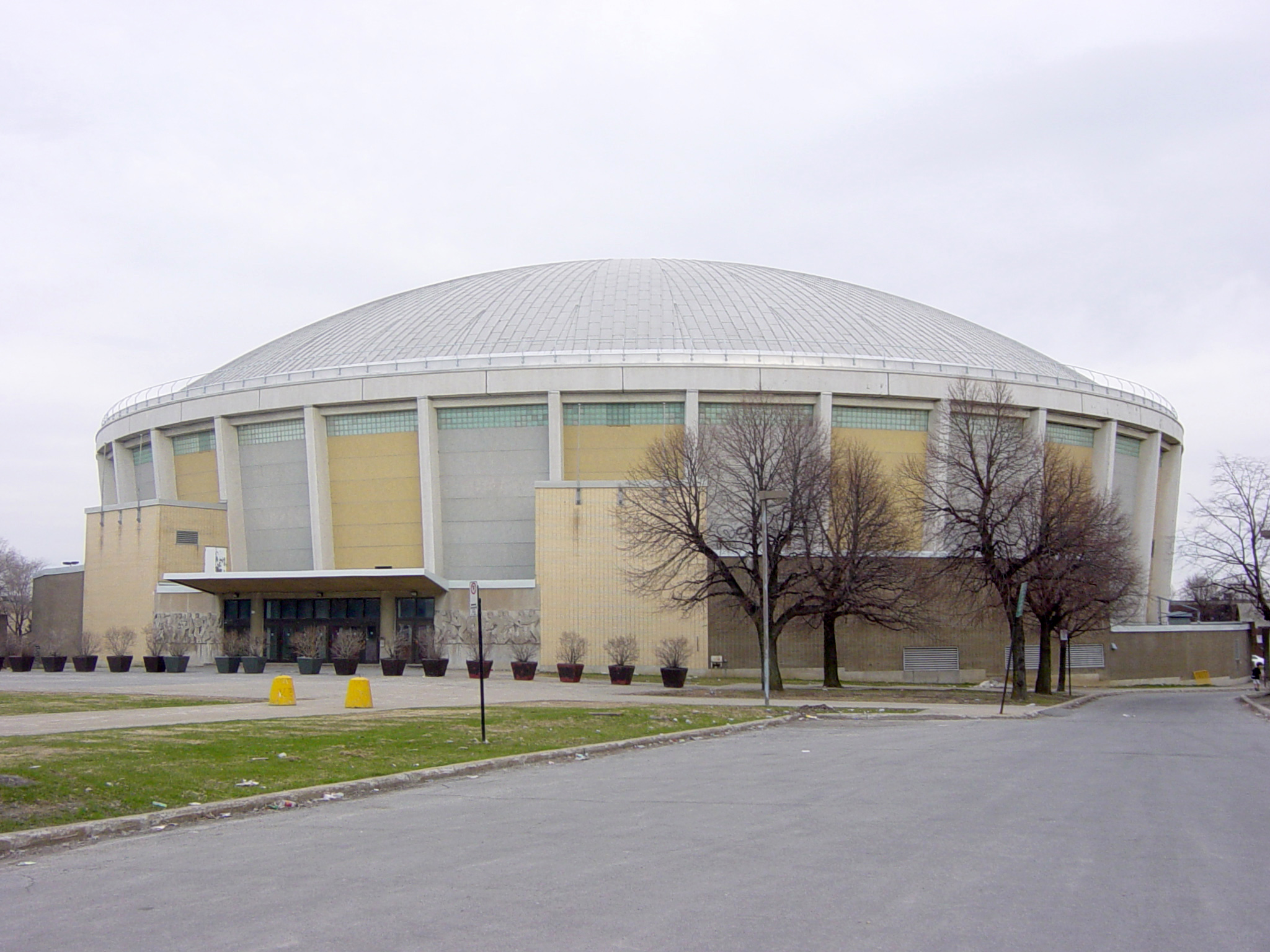
Maurice Richard Arena hosted wrestling at the 1976 Summer Olympics in Montreal.

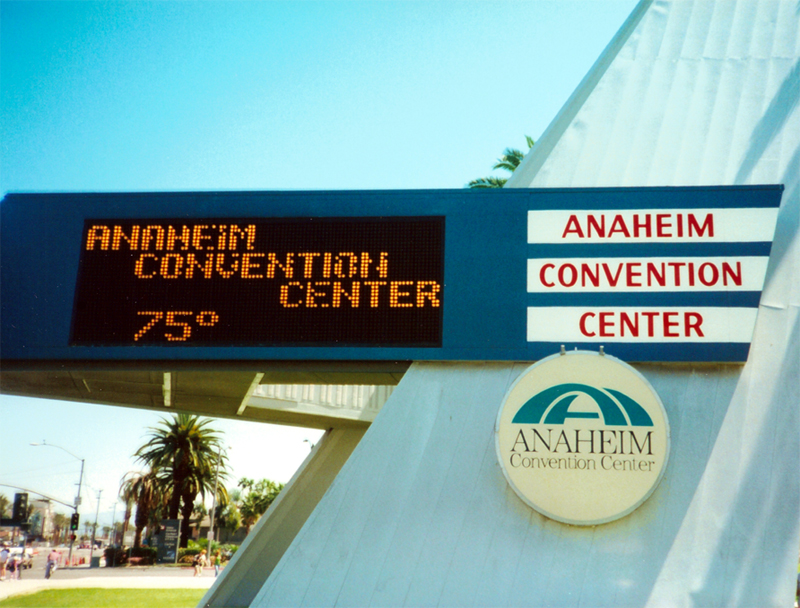
Anaheim Convention Center hosted wrestling at the 1984 Summer Olympics in Los Angeles.

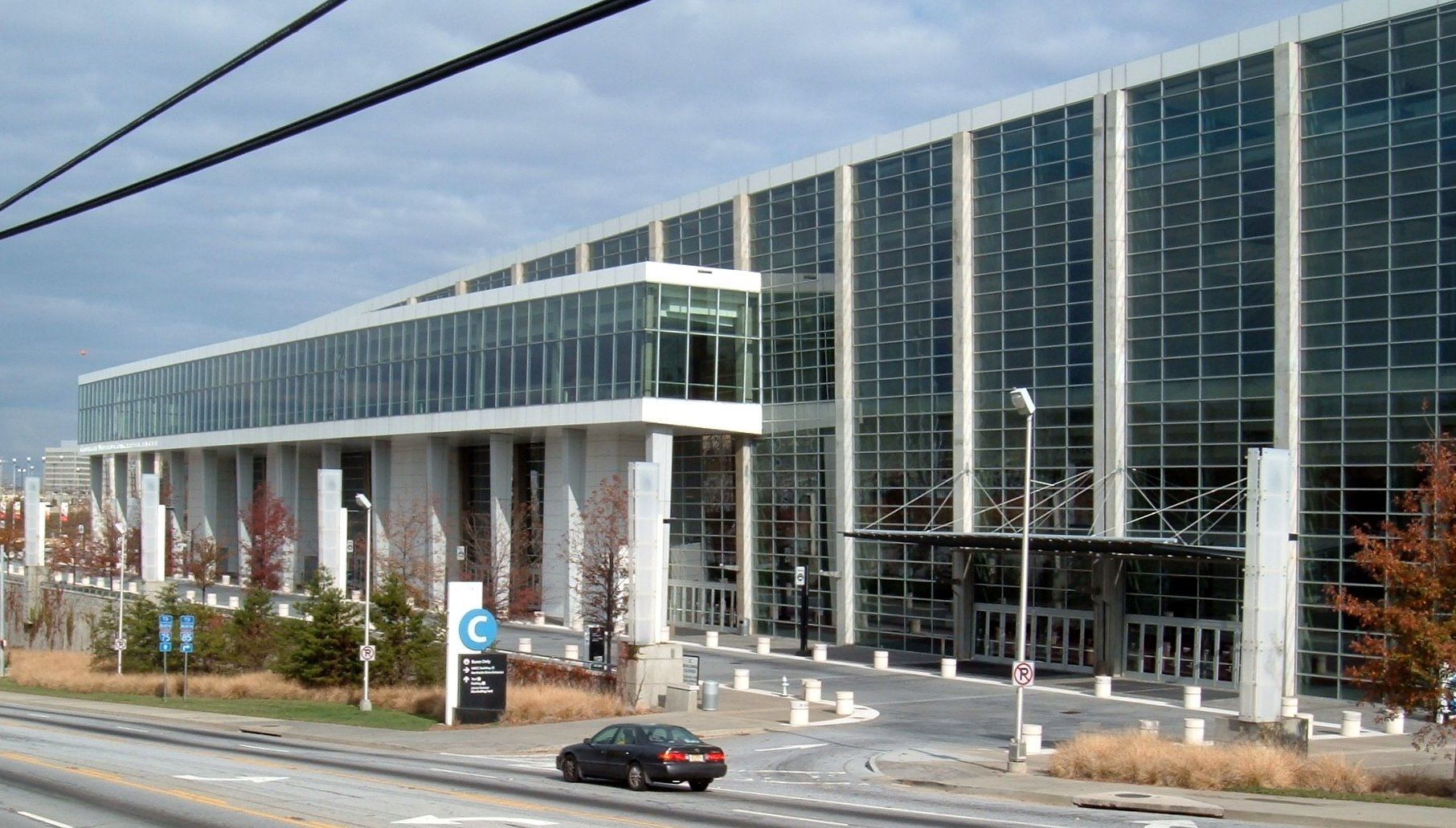
Georgia World Congress Center hosted wrestling at the 1996 Summer Olympics in Atlanta.

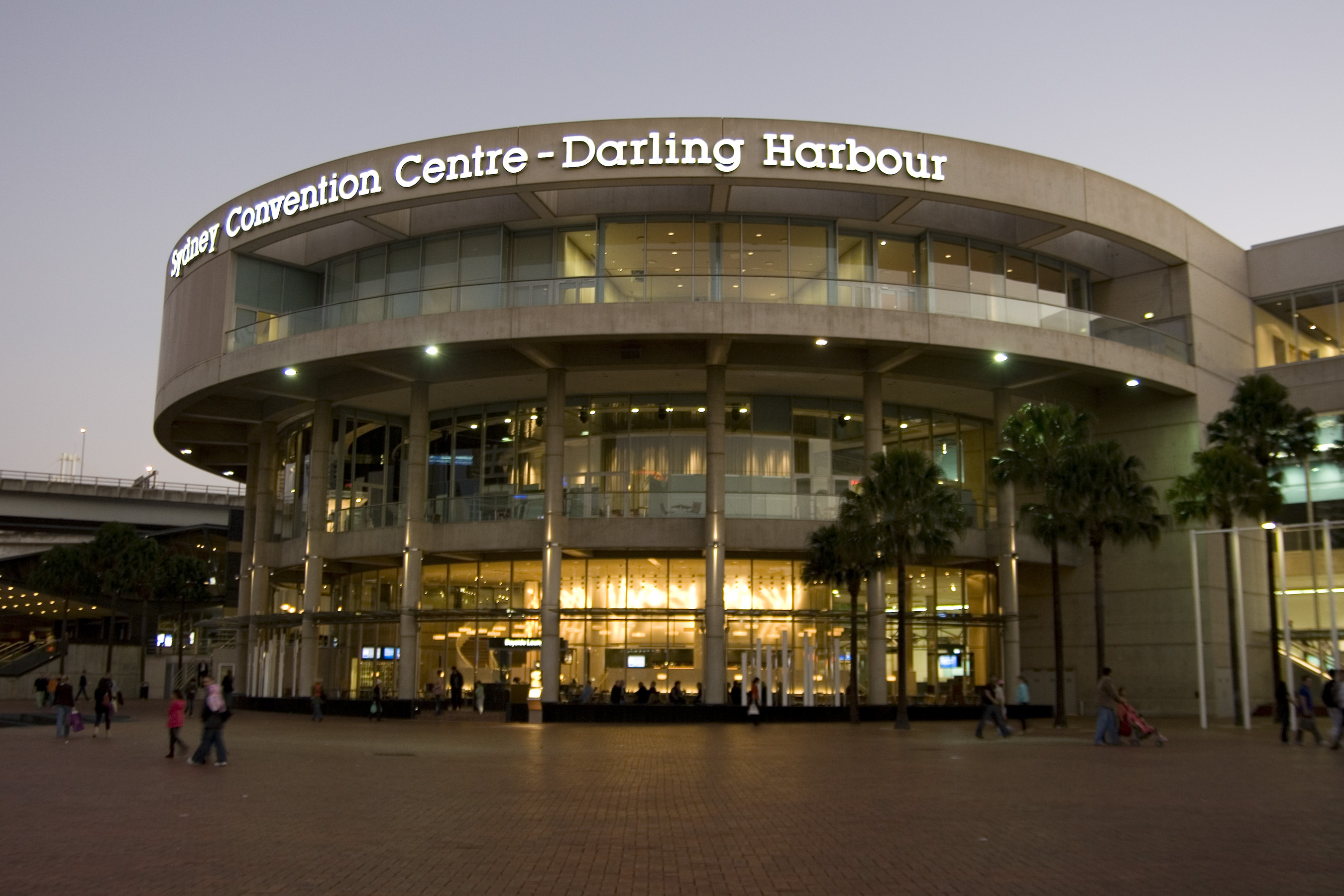
The Sydney Convention and Exhibition Centre hosted wrestling at the 2000 Summer Olympics.

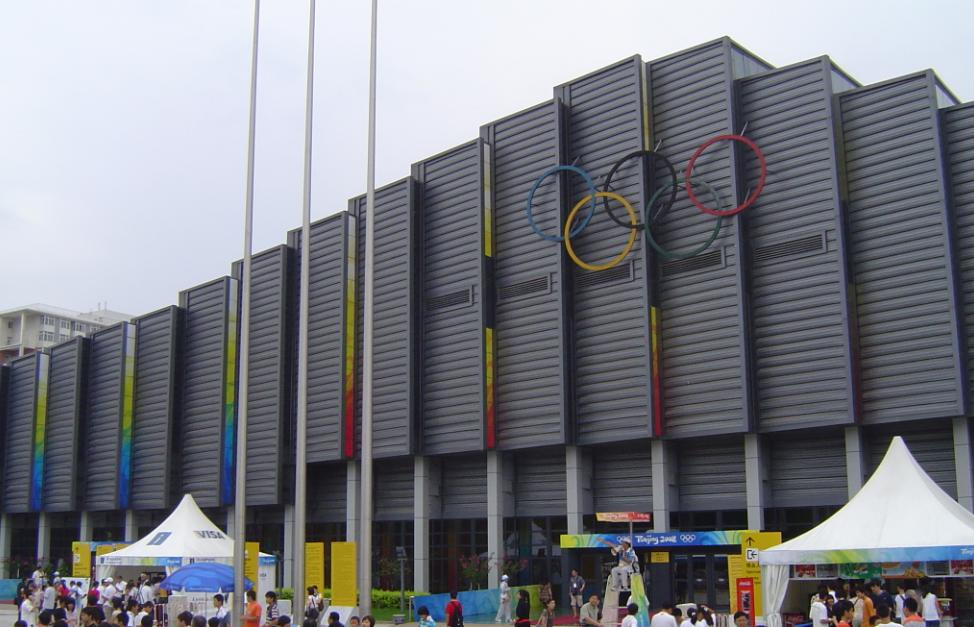
China Agricultural University Gymnasium hosted wrestling at the 2008 Summer Olympics in Beijing.

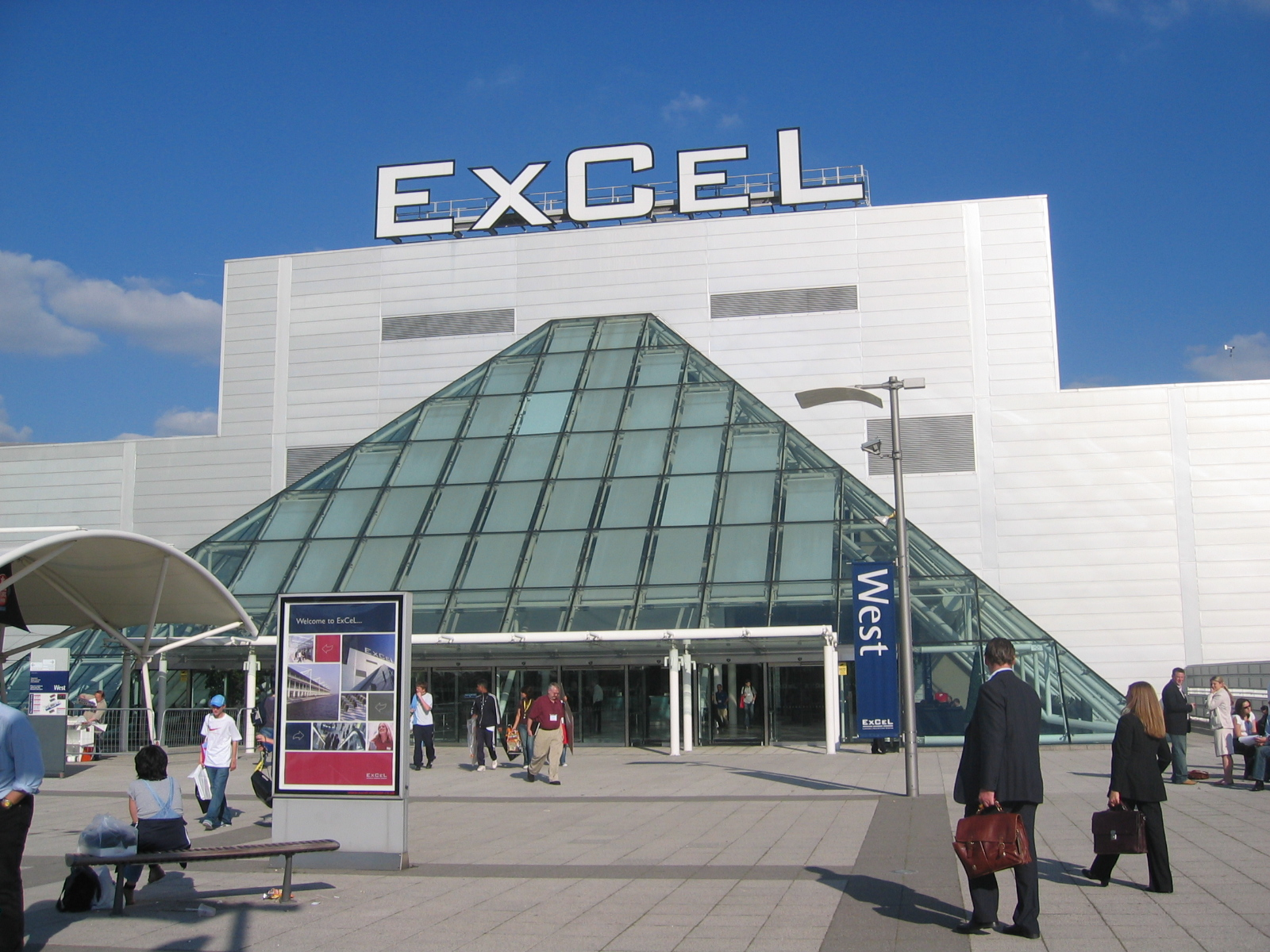
ExCeL hosted the wrestling at the 2012 Summer Olympics in London.

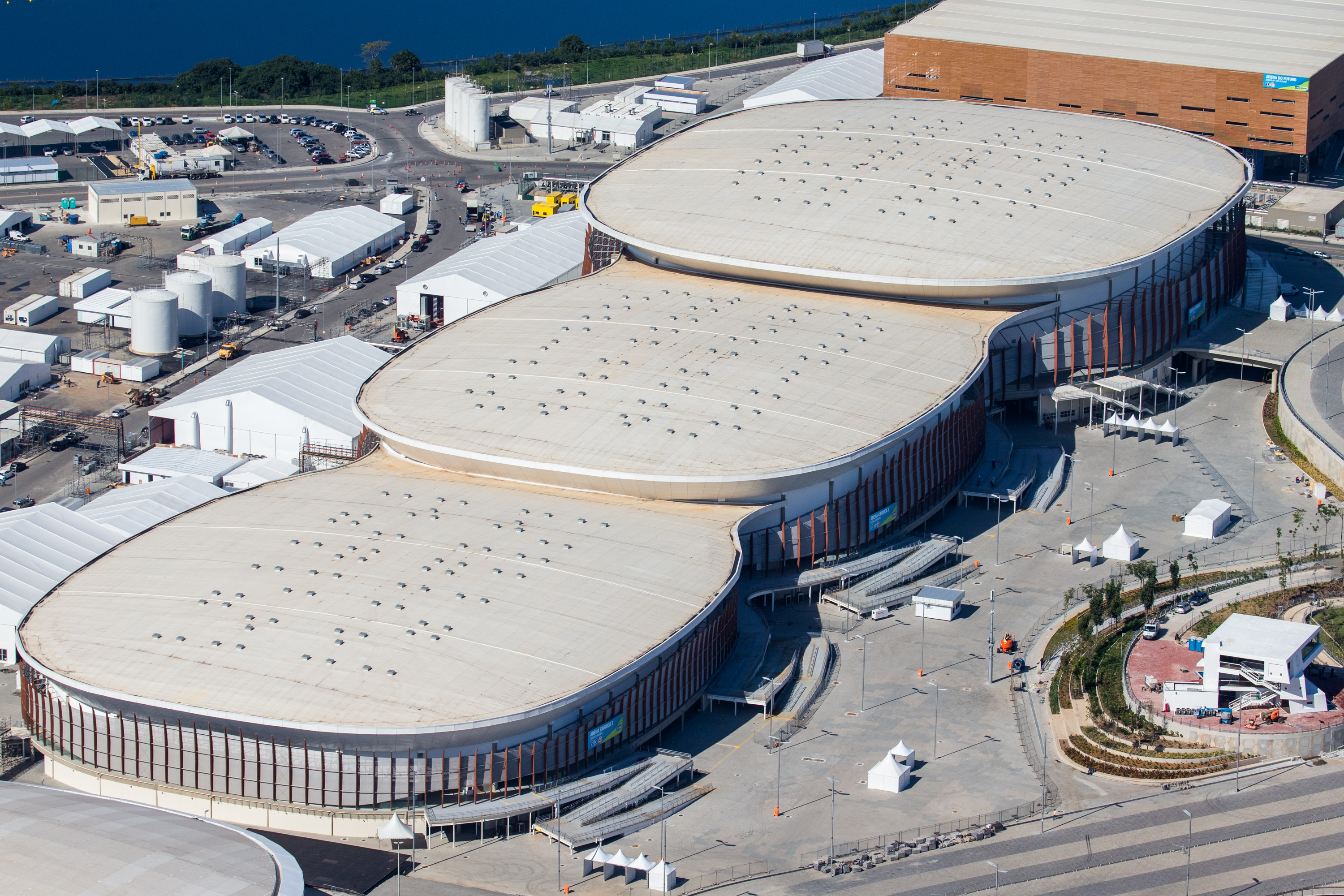
Carioca Arena 2 hosted wrestling at the 2016 Summer Olympics in Rio de Janeiro.

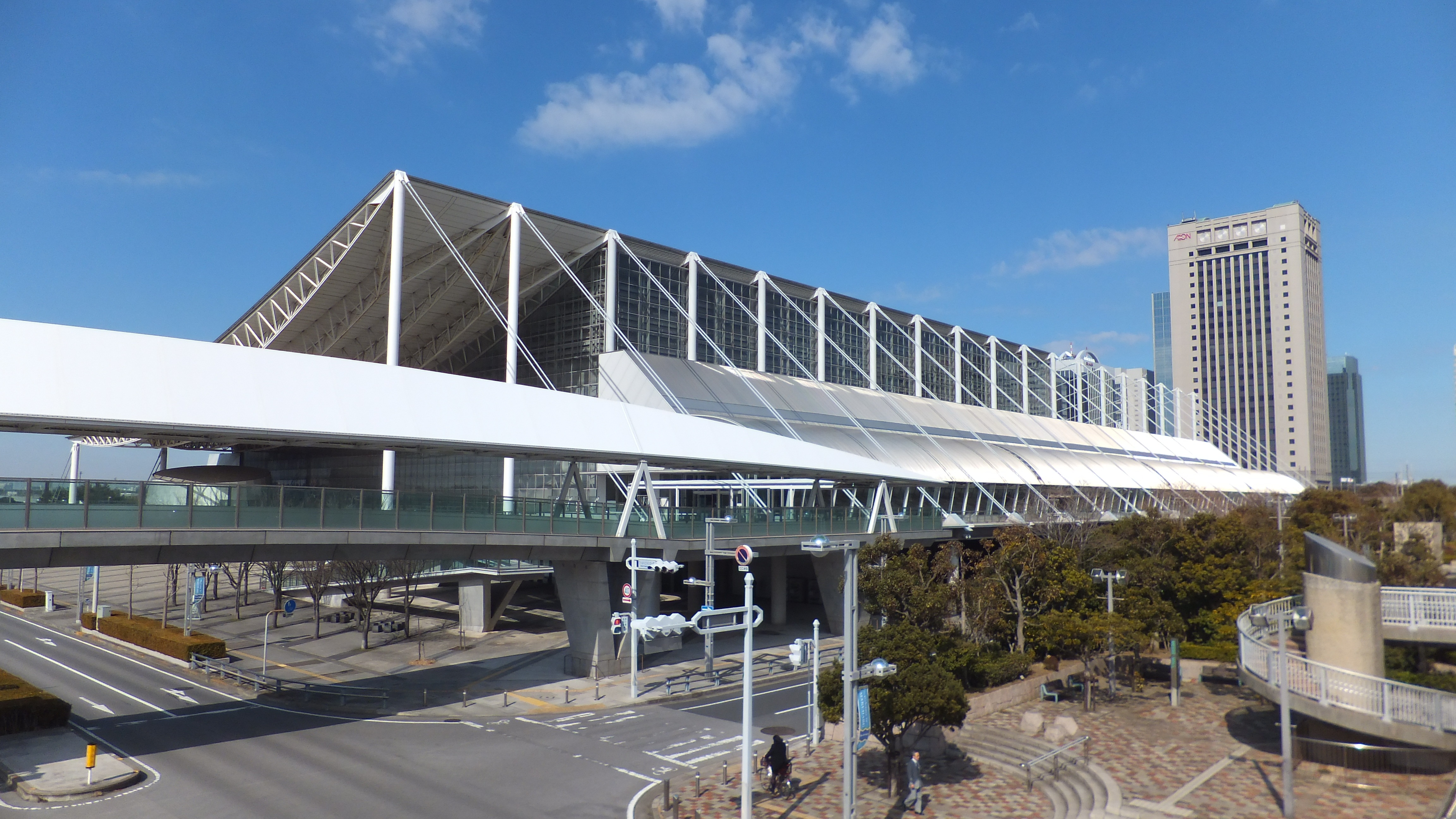
Makuhari Messe hosted wrestling at the 2020 Summer Olympics in Tokyo.

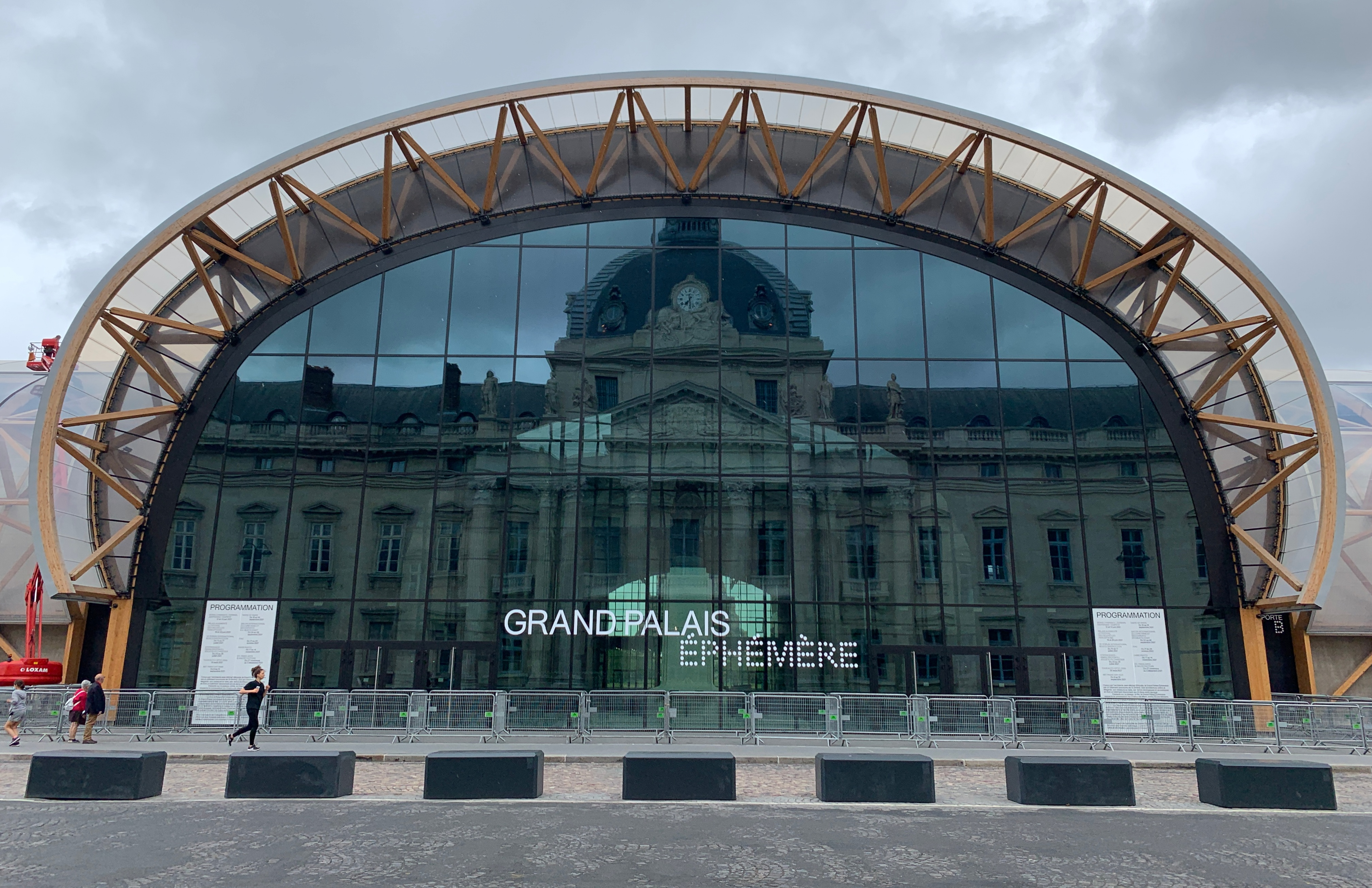
Grand Palais Éphémère hosted wrestling at the 2024 Summer Olympics in Paris.

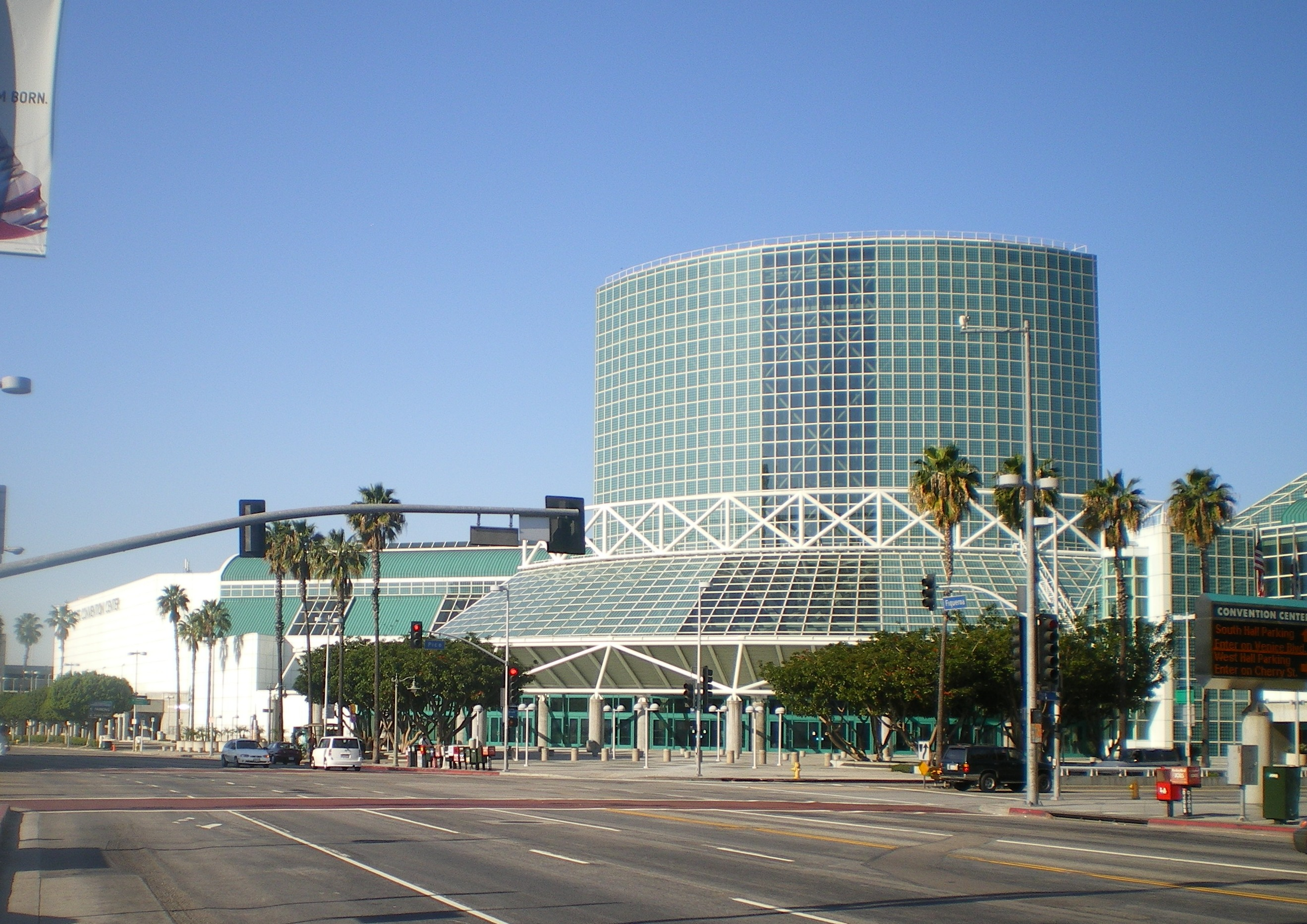
The Los Angeles Convention Center will host wrestling at the 2028 Summer Olympics.

== See also ==
- Greco-Roman wrestling
- Freestyle wrestling
