= Hylander =

Hylander is a Swedish surname. Notable people with the surname include:

- Anders Hylander (1883–1967), Swedish gymnast
- Dan Hylander (born 1954), Swedish songwriter, singer, and guitarist
- Nils Hylander (1904–1970), Swedish botanist and mycologist
- Sigfrid Hylander (1902–1978), Swedish Olympic weightlifter
