= Hunting Art Prize =

- Location: Houston, Texas (current)
- Country: United Kingdom (1981–2005), United States (2006–present)
- Presented by: Hunting plc

The Hunting Art Prize is awarded annually to an artist for excellence in drawing and painting. The prize of $50,000, sponsored by Hunting plc, was established in the United Kingdom in 1981 and was mostly awarded to British artists before relocating to Houston in 2006. Since then it has been awarded to Texas artists.

== Prizewinners ==
=== Texas ===
- 2016: Padaric Kolander for "You Step In" (drawing)
- 2015: Kevin Peterson for "Fire" (painting)
- 2014: Winston Lee Mascarenhas for "Rite of Spring" (painting)
- 2013: Marshall K. Harris for ""Round Up" B.F. Smith & Son Saddlery Circa 1940-1942" (graphite drawing)
- 2012: Michael Bise for "Children" (graphite drawing)
- 2011: Leigh Anne Lester for "Mutant Spectre"
- 2010: Lane Hagood for "Books I Have Possessed" (painting)
- 2009: Robyn O'Neil for "A death, a fall, a march: toward a better world "
- 2008: Wendy Wagner for "I Hope I'm Dreaming" (painting)
- 2007: Michael Tole for "Untitled (Woman)"
- 2006: Francesca Fuchs

=== UK ===
- 2005: Adam Holmes-Davies for "The Sound of Silence" (oil)
- 2004: Henry Kondracki for "Little Eddie Looking North" (oil)
- 2003: Lisa Wright for "Diving" (oil)
- 2002: Nicholas Archer for "Flying Dumbo" (oil)
- 2001: Nicholas Charles Williams for "Searching III" (oil)
- 2000: Anita Taylor for "Containing Things" (charcoal)
- 1999: Gus Cummins for "Attendant Facts" (oil)
- 1998: Jennifer McRae for "What If? A Portrait" (oil)
- 1997: Martin Fuller for "Moving Figure" (oil)
- 1996: Colin Smith for "Wardrobe 8" (oil)
- 1995: Mary Griffiths for "Untitled" (oil)
- 1994: Michael Corkrey for "Fiona" (oil)
- 1993: Shani Rhys James for "Red Self Portrait" (oil)
- 1992: Dick Lee "The Wood Pile" (oil)
- 1991: Barry Burman for "Manac es" (oil)
- 1990: Gus Cummins for "Pretty Little Zygodatyle" (oil)
- 1989: Martin Churchill for "Building with Dust Sheets" (oil)
- 1988: Edward Chell for "Across the Mill, Jarrow Steel Works" (oil); Tom Phillips for "Michael Kustow" (Oil)
- 1987: William Pullen for "Amia" (Egg tempera)
- 1986: Anthony Wishaw for "Still Life with landscape" (acrylic); Anthony Green for "The Life Drawing, circa 1961-1962" (oil)
- 1985: Charles Bone for "Puttenham Common" (watercolour); Daphne Todd for "Four Spanish Chairs" (oil)
- 1984: Jane Carpanini for "Backyards, Treorchy" (watercolour); Robert Buhler for "Vineyards, Neuchatel" (oil)
- 1983: John Gardiner Crawford for "Below the Cliffs" (watercolour); Ken Howard for "Self Portrait at South Bolton Gardens" (oil)
- 1982: F Donald Blake for "Stormy Harbour" (watercolour); Margaret Thomas for "The Rembrandt Drawing" (oil)
- 1981: Hans Schwarz for "Wills Neck, Quantocks" (watercolour); Richard Eurich for "Weymouth Bay 1980" (oil)

== See also ==
- Lists of art awards
