= Bachtell =

Bachtell is a surname. Notable people with the surname include:

- John Bachtell (born 1956), American Marxist, activist, trade unionist and community organizer
- Richard Bachtell (1906–1990), American weightlifter
- Tom Bachtell (born 1957), American illustrator and caricaturist
