= Henri Rivière =

Henri Rivière may refer to:

- Henri Rivière (naval officer) (1827–1883), French naval commander involved in the conquest of northern Vietnam
- Henri Rivière (painter) (1864–1951), French artist, designer and theatrical technician
- Georges Henri Rivière (1897–1985), French museologist
- Henri Rivière (bobsleigh) (1922–1989), French Olympic bobsledder
- Henri Rivière (weightlifter) (1906–1984), French Olympic weightlifter
