= Frederick Donald Blake =

Scottish artist (1908–1997)

- Born: 7 June 1908; Greenock, Scotland
- Died: c. 1 July 1997 (aged 89); England
- Movement: Propaganda poster artist

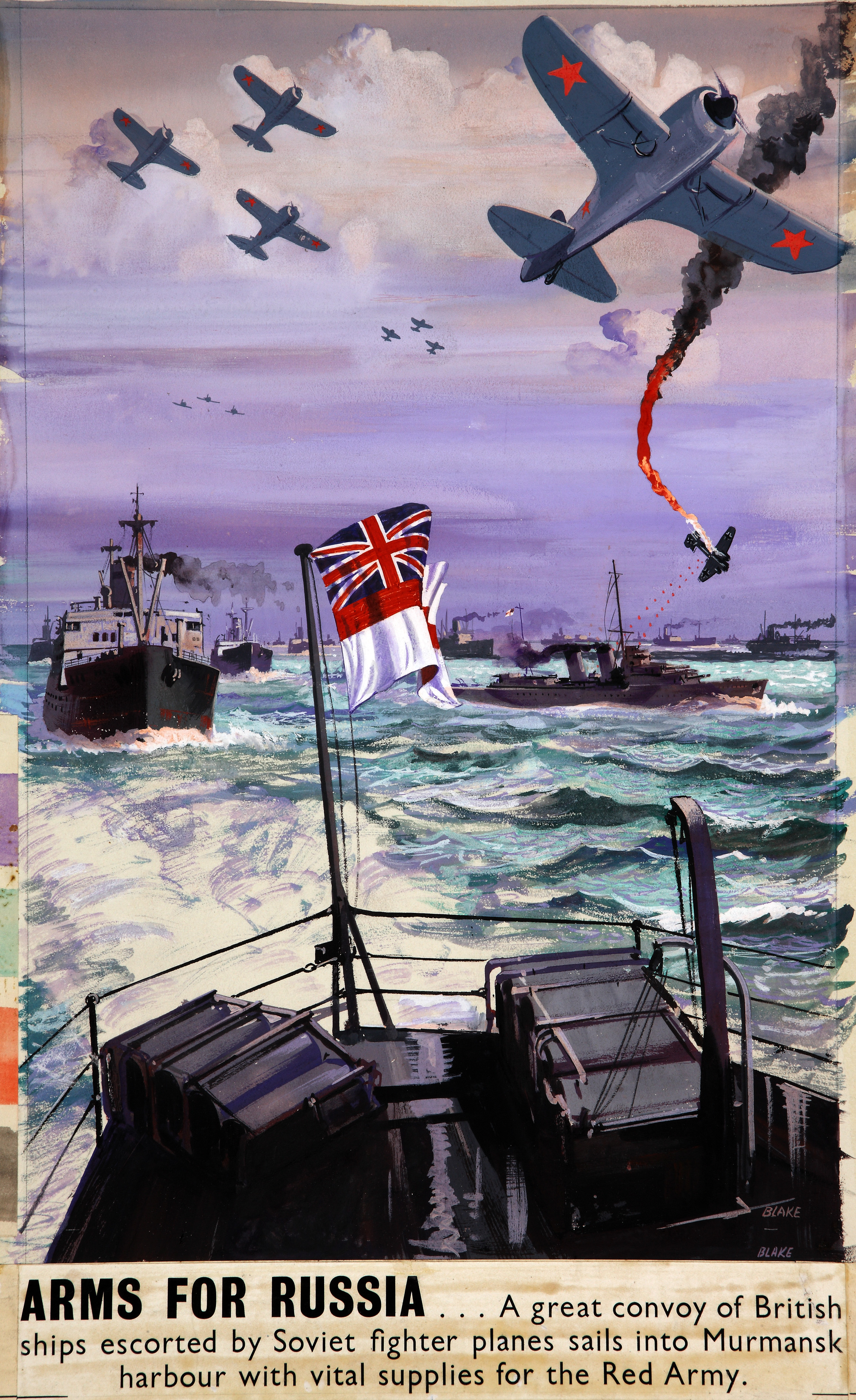
Wartime artwork by Blake for the Ministry of Information

Frederick Donald Blake Royal Institute of Painters in Water Colours, RSMA (1908 – 1997) was a Scottish artist who created industrial designs, etches, poster art and paintings.

== Biography ==
Born in Greenock, Scotland, on 7 June 1908, Blake's family moved to London when he was a child and he remained in the South for the rest of his life. He trained at Camberwell School of Art and at 15 years of age started work as an architectural draughtsman in the interior design business.

Early in 1940 he was drafted into a small group of war artists producing propaganda work for the Ministry of Information, and for three evenings a week worked for the Daily Express drawing war maps and impressions of battles. On the other nights he worked long hours as an Air Raid Fire Officer. During this period he began to exhibit his paintings. He had work shown at the Royal Academy together with other Open Exhibitions in London.

As a freelance designer after the war, he worked for the aircraft industry, the railways and on road safety campaigns to mention but a few. But it was his painting that always took first place. By the early 1960s he had earned himself a considerable reputation as an artist.

After much experimentation he had perfected the use of a clay-coated paper, which freed him from many of the limitations in watercolour. Having finished the painting he applied a coat of varnish, which brought another depth and dimension to his work.

Blake also worked in oil with the same flair. Nothing escaped his notice or his wit. Whether he was painting a muddy foreshore with rusting cranes, the wilds of the Cornish Moors, people, deckchairs blowing in the breeze, market scenes, his beloved Tuscany, delicate flower studies, buildings or bric-a-brac, the viewer was always drawn to the painting.

He was elected a member of the RI, the RSMA, the NEAC, the Chelsea Arts Club, the Wapping Group of Artists and the London Sketch Club, serving on the councils of all these societies. In 1982 he won the Hunting Art Prize for his watercolour "Stormy Harbour".

His work has been shown in Los Angeles, San Francisco, Chicago, Düsseldorf and Brussels, as well as a number of noted galleries in London.
