= Arthur Reinmann =

Swiss weightlifter

Personal information
- Nationality: Swiss
- Born: 1901
- Died: 1983 (aged 81–82)
- Weight: 130 lb (59 kg)

Sport
- Sport: Weightlifting
Medal record
Men's Weightlifting
Representing Switzerland
Olympic Games
| Bronze medal – third place | 1924 Paris | –60 kg |

Arthur Reinmann (1901–1983) was a Swiss weightlifter who competed in the 1924 and 1928 Summer Olympics. In 1924 he won a bronze medal in the featherweight class. Four years later he finished fifth in the 1928 featherweight competition.
