= Rodolphe Catalaa =

French weightlifter (1897–1943)

Personal information
- Full name: Rodolphe Clément Catalaa
- Nationality: French
- Born: 18 September 1897; Butte-Chaumont, Paris, France
- Died: 12 August 1943 (aged 45) arrondissement de l'Observatoire, Paris, German-occupied France

Sport
- Sport: Weightlifting

Rodolphe Catalaa (18 September 1897 – 12 August 1943) was a French weightlifter. He competed in the men's featherweight event at the 1924 Summer Olympics.
