= Robert Buhler =

Robert Buhler RA (23 November 1916 – 20 June 1989) was a Swiss landscape and portrait artist who was born in England, where he mostly worked.

In Switzerland his name is spelled Bühler.

== Early life ==
Buhler was born in London to Swiss parents, Robert Buhler and Lucie Kronig, who had married there. His father was a journalist and aircraft designer.

The young Buhler studied commercial art in Basel and at the Kunstgewerbeschule, Zürich. In 1933 he returned to London, where his mother had a bookshop and café in Charlotte Street, Fitzrovia. He was a student at the School of Photoengraving and Lithography, Bolt Court, then in 1934 joined the Saint Martin's School of Art, where he was taught by Leon Underwood and Vivian Pitchforth. In 1935 he won a scholarship to the Royal College of Art, but was there for only six weeks. He befriended members of the Euston Road School, some of whom visited his mother's bookshop, and this influenced him towards landscape painting and his use of restrained tones, although he did not join the group.

When the National Registration Act 1939 recorded all residents in October 1939, Buhler's parents were divorced, and he and his first wife were living in Doughty Street, St Pancras, where he was registered as "Painter, Commercial Artist".

== Career ==
Buhler painted London scenes and exhibited in the Royal Academy Summer Exhibitions from 1945 to 1948. While mostly a painter of places, he was also a portrait artist, his sitters including Francis Bacon, Barnett Freedman, John Minton, Ruskin Spear, Stephen Spender, and Edith Evans playing Volumnia in Coriolanus.

Buhler exhibited at many galleries and taught at the Wimbledon School of Art, the Royal College of Art, the Chelsea School of Art and the Central School of Arts and Crafts. He was elected an Associate of the Royal Academy (ARA) on 24 April 1947.

In 1948 Buhler joined the London Group. He lived in Chelsea and painted many cityscapes, typically using muted colours, often using upstairs windows as a view point. On 21 February 1956 he was promoted to a full Royal Academician, and in that capacity took part in the selection process for the Academy’s Summer Exhibition. He took holidays in Brittany and painted scenes there. In 1982 Buhler won the Wollaston Award of the Royal Academy and in 1984 the Hunting Art Prize for his painting 'Vineyards, Neuchâtel'.

== Private life ==
In January 1938, Buhler married Evelyn M. Rowell, and they had one son, Michael, born in 1940. They divorced in 1951, and in 1962 Buhler married secondly Prudence Brochocka, but in 1972 this marriage also ended in divorce.

Buhler’s son Michael, who also became an artist, was taught by his father at the Royal College of Art. He recalled his father suffering from visits from bailiffs as late as the 1960s "with patches on the walls where paintings had been, and ominous gaps among the furniture."

Buhler died on 20 June 1989, while living at 38, Onslow Square. He left an estate valued at £174,090.
