= Jane Carpanini =

British artist and teacher

- Born: 1949 (age 76–77); Streatley, Bedfordshire, UK
- Education: Luton College of Technology; Brighton Polytechnic; University of Reading
- Known for: Painting

Jane Carpanini (born 1949) is a British artist and teacher, known for her watercolour paintings.

== Biography ==
Carpanini was born in Streatley in Bedfordshire. She attended Luton College of Technology during 1967 and 1968 before studying art at Brighton Polytechnic between 1968 and 1971 and then at the School of Education at the University of Reading from 1972 to 1973. After graduation from Reading she taught at a number of schools, including the Oundle School and the Kings High School for Girls in Warwick, where she served as head of Art and Design. In 1977 Carpanini was elected a member of the Royal West of England Academy and to the Royal Society of British Artists and the Royal Watercolour Society, RWS, the following year. She eventually served as the honorary treasurer of the RWS.

In 1984 Carpanini won the Hunting Art Prize. Solo exhibitions of her work have been hosted by the Arts Council of Wales and the National Museum of Wales and several commercial art galleries, including the Patricia Wells Gallery in Thornbury and the Fosse Gallery in Stow-on-the-Wold. Carpanini has exhibited at the Royal Academy in London, at the Royal West of England Academy in Bristol and at the Royal Society of British Artists. The landscape of Wales, and in particular that of Snowdonia, are frequent subjects of Carpanini's paintings and works by Carpanini are held by the National Library of Wales in Aberystwyth and the National Museum of Wales in Cardiff.
