= Eugen Mühlberger =

German weightlifter

Personal information
- Born: 30 August 1902; Ludwigshafen, Germany
- Died: 1 August 1944 (aged 41) or 1943; Soviet Union

Sport
- Country: Germany
- Sport: Weightlifting
- Weight class: featherweight
- Club: VfK 86 Mannheim
- Updated on 12 December 2016

Eugen Mühlberger (30 August 1902 – 1 August 1944 or 1943) was a German weightlifter, who competed in the featherweight category and represented Germany at international competitions. He won German national championships in 1925–27, 1929, 1930 and 1932. He competed at the 1928 Summer Olympics, where he placed 11th among 21 competitors. Mühlberger set the world record in the featherweight category in the snatch, lifting 93 kg on 18 March 1929 in Hamburg. He won the European Weightlifting Championships in 1930, placed second the following year, held the world record in his division in 1931, but did not attend the 1932 Summer Olympics held in Los Angeles.

Mühlberger died during the Second World War in August 1944 having been missing in action while fighting on the eastern front in the Soviet Union.
