= Barry Burman =

English artist (1943–2001)

- Born: 14 June 1943; Bedford, England
- Died: 17 February 2001 (aged 57); Warwick, England
- Education: Royal College of Art
- Known for: Painting

Barry Burman (1943–2001) was an English figurative artist, known for his dark and often disturbing subject matter. He was an artist and teacher. He took an overdose and died aged 57.

== Early life ==
Burman was born in Bedford in June 1943. He gained a 2/1 degree in fine art at Coventry College of Art and continued his studies for a while at the Royal College of Art. Tutors at Coventry included Michael Sandle and Ivor Abrahams both Royal Academicians. Fellow students on his course were Mike Baldwin the conceptualist artist, Fred Orton the art historian, Sue Gollifer the print miniaturist and digital artist, Phillip Wetton who went on to teach at Brown University in the United States.

== Employment ==
Despite his success as an artist, he continued to teach part-time at Mid-Warwickshire College in Leamington between 1974 and 1994.

== Artistic method ==
Burman painted with oil, acrylic, ink, and wax crayon mixed with egg yolk and vinegar on thick paper to produce a leathery surface.

Shortly before his death, Burman began to work in a new medium, creating a series of Papier-mâché figures / puppets – a return in three dimensions to earlier themes ('Leather Face', 'Uncle Tic Tac' and 'Tommy Rawhead').

== Artistic themes ==
"If one had erroneously formed an impression of sadism or brutality, an encounter with the artist changed one's mind. His nature was as far as one could get from that of the monsters he portrayed. He was the most gentle, the most non-judgemental, the most modest man, affectionate to his friends, caring of them, supportive, and he was also among the most committed of artists."

=== Sexuality and feminism ===
His early paintings are described by the critic Peter Webb as: "meticulous and controversial images which addressed his ideas on women's sexuality; provocative schoolgirls on black leather sofas; malevolent nudes clutching Victorian dolls; and threatening femme fatales grasping severed male heads". According to Webb, this led on one occasion to a physical attack from feminist critics on a BBC2 television program.

=== Murder ===
In the 1980s, he created a number of images inspired by both real-life and fictional serial killers, including Jack the Ripper, Ed Gein, and Hannibal Lecter. According to Malcolm Yorke, he visited the scenes of the Whitechapel murders which "still exuded a scent of evil, or 'agony traces' as he called them".

In 1991, Burman won the Hunting Group / The Observer award with his painting 'Manac Es', inspired by the Whitechapel murders as fictionalised in Iain Sinclair's first novel 'White Chappell, Scarlet Tracings'.

=== Street scenes ===
Also in the 1980s, Burman painted a number of street scenes (including 'Angel Alley') and doorways in Whitechapel: "The area's blistered paint and cancerous brickwork ... offered him visual stimuli – and nobody could suggest more menace in a wall or cracked window than Burman".

=== Politics ===
In the 1980s, he tackled political themes, most notably the "chauvinism and bloody mindedness" of Margaret Thatcher's premiership and the Falklands War ('Patriots').

== Solo exhibitions ==
During his lifetime, Burman had nine solo exhibitions:

- 1969: Coventry College of Art
- 1969: Leamington Spa Art Gallery
- 1971: University of Warwick
- 1974: Ikon Gallery, Birmingham
- 1977: Warwick Gallery
- 1982: Herbert Art Gallery, Coventry
- 1992: Nicholas Treadwell Gallery, London
- 1997: Loyal to the Nightmare, Goldmark Gallery, Uppingham
- 1999: The Pilgrim's Progress: Goldmark Gallery, Uppingham

John Bunyan's The Pilgrim's Progress was based upon a work that is said to be placed in American hotel bedrooms because it is too dull for anyone to steal it. Glyn Hughes has linked the idea to Burman's own childhood (he was baptised in the same font as Bunyan and regularly visited the church), his belief in Republicanism shared with Bunyan, and a healing process for Burman himself.

Following his death, there have been three retrospective exhibitions:

- 2004: Barry Burman retrospective, The Royal Pump Rooms, Leamington Spa
- 2007: The Unseen Burman, Gallery 12, London
- 2008: Burman – Barry Burman 1943–2001, Knifesmith Gallery, Bristol

== Other exhibitions ==
Burman also exhibited at many group shows in the UK and abroad.

== Dedication ==
Nicholas Royle's novel Antwerp (Serpent's Tail, 2004) is dedicated to Barry Burman.

== Death ==
Burman took an overdose and died in 2001, aged 57.
