= Casimiro Vega =

Argentine weightlifter

Personal information
- Nationality: Argentine
- Born: 1907

Sport
- Sport: Weightlifting

Casimiro Vega (born 1907, date of death unknown) was an Argentine weightlifter. He competed in the men's featherweight event at the 1928 Summer Olympics.
