= Sante Scarcia =

Italian weightlifter

Personal information
- Nationality: Italian
- Born: 12 June 1903; Bari, Italy
- Died: 14 May 1994 (aged 90)

Sport
- Sport: Weightlifting

Sante Scarcia (12 June 1903 – 14 May 1994) was an Italian weightlifter. He competed in the men's featherweight event at the 1924 Summer Olympics.
