= Andreas Stadler (weightlifter) =

Austrian weightlifter (1896–1941)

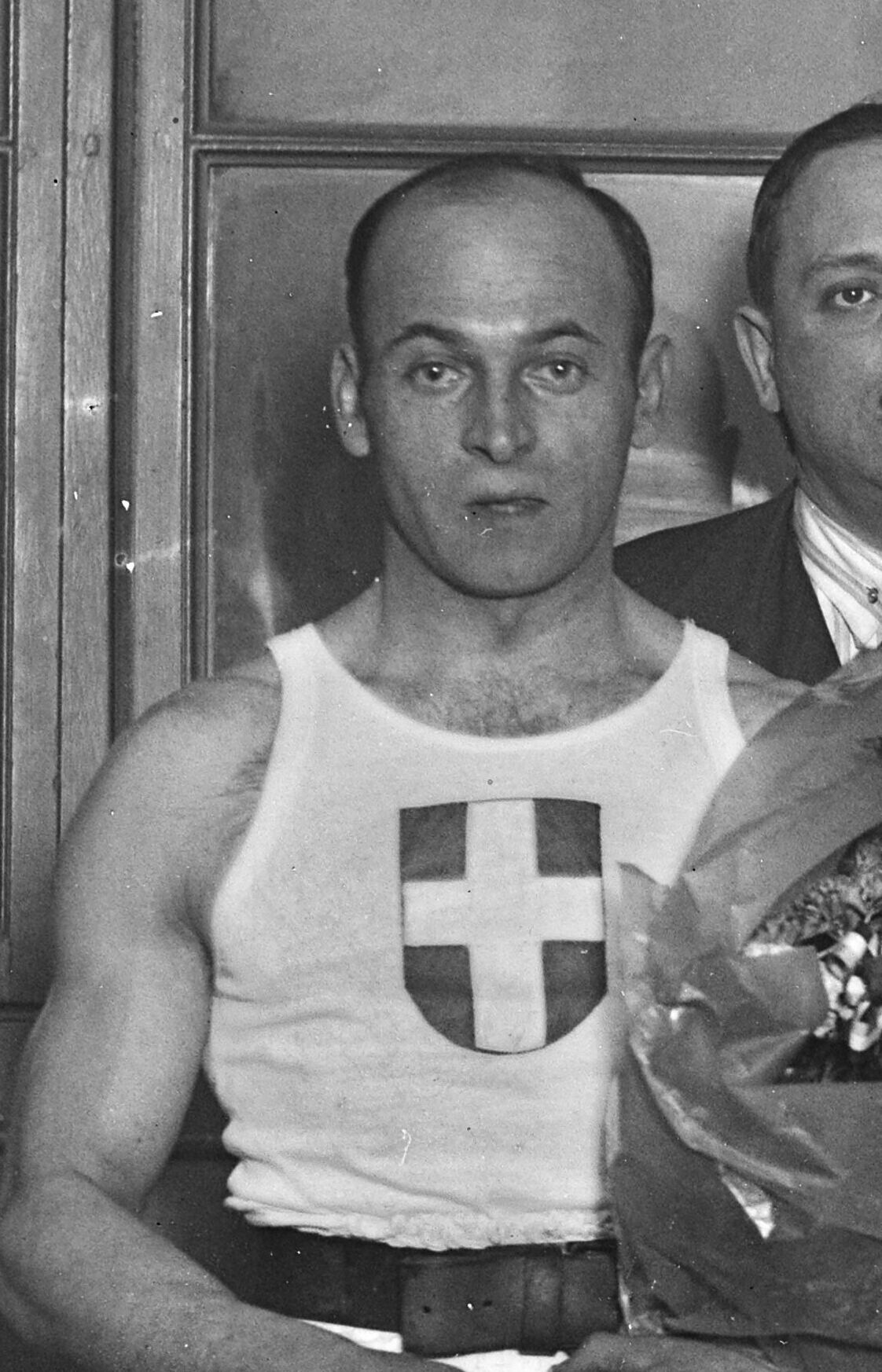
- Andres Stadler in 1927

Medal record

Men's weightlifting

Representing Austria

Olympic Games
Silver medal – second place	1924 Paris	-60 kg

Andreas Stadler (31 July 1896 – 14 February 1941) was an Austrian weightlifter who competed in the 1924 and 1928 Summer Olympics. In 1924 he won the silver medal in the featherweight class. Four years later at the 1928 Games he finished sixth in the featherweight class.
