= Antonín Hrabě =

Czech weightlifter

Personal information
- Nationality: Czech
- Born: 10 June 1902
- Died: 21 March 1933 (aged 30)

Sport
- Country: Czechoslovakia
- Sport: Weightlifting

Antonín Hrabě (10 June 1902 – 21 March 1933) was a Czech weightlifter. He competed for Czechoslovakia in the men's featherweight event at the 1924 Summer Olympics, where he placed 9th overall.
