= Justin Tissot =

Swiss weightlifter

Personal information
- Nationality: Swiss
- Born: 20 May 1902
- Died: 17 September 1983 (aged 81) Biel/Bienne, Switzerland

Sport
- Sport: Weightlifting

Justin Tissot (pronounced [tiso]; 20 May 1902 – 17 September 1983) was a Swiss weightlifter. He competed in the men's featherweight event at the 1928 Summer Olympics.
