= Alfred Hopkins (weightlifter) =

British weightlifter

Personal information
- Nationality: British
- Born: 16 May 1900; West Ham, England
- Died: 16 April 1986 (aged 85); Romford, England

Sport
- Sport: Weightlifting

Alfred Hopkins (16 May 1900 – 16 April 1986) was a British weightlifter. He competed in the men's featherweight event at the 1928 Summer Olympics.
