= Nicolaas Moerloos =

Belgian sportsperson (1900–1944)

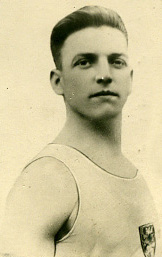
- Moerloos c. 1920

Personal information
- Born: 10 August 1900
- Died: 5 September 1944 (aged 44)

Gymnastics career
- Discipline: Men's artistic gymnastics
- Country represented: Belgium
Medal record
Men's artistic gymnastics
Representing Belgium
Olympic Games
Silver medal – second place	1920 Antwerp	Team, European system

Nicolaas Moerloos (10 August 1900 – 5 September 1944) was a Belgian gymnast and weightlifter who competed in the 1920 and the 1924 Summer Olympics. He was born in Sint-Niklaas and died in Belsele. In 1920 he won the silver medal as a member of the Belgian gymnastics team in the European system event. Four years later he finished twelfth in the featherweight weightlifting competition at the 1924 Games.

He was killed during World War II, as a resistant in an encounter with Germans towards the end of the war.
