= Margaret Thomas (painter) =

British painter

- Born: 26 September 1916; London, United Kingdom
- Died: 27 March 2016 (aged 99)
- Known for: Painting

Margaret Thomas (26 September 1916 – 27 March 2016) was a British painter. She is remembered in particular for her still lifes and her flower paintings which received considerable acclaim, and are in numerous UK public collections.

== Career ==
It is probably in the still life with flowers, an inexhaustible subject for her that Margaret Thomas is best known....she sometimes finds unexpected beauty at the point when most people would consign the flowers to the dustbin; a faded or drooping plant can have its own sad charm. She is able to paint, with apparently casual directness, pictures that are strongly and visually designed, partly because she is lucky enough to have been trained at a time before art schools gave up drawing.

— Bernard Dunstan

Thomas was born in London, England on 26 September 1916. When she was 12 years old she was introduced to Ethel Walker, and other women artists, by her governess. Thomas would later exhibit pieces in the same shows as Walker. In 1934 Thomas began her studies at Sidcup School of Art. She continued, having won a scholarship, at the Slade School of Fine Art in London. For her final year, she studied at the Royal Academy Schools under Thomas Monnington and Ernest Jackson. Her works were being noticed as early as 1938: commenting on an exhibition of The Women Artists, The Observer noted that "most of the outstanding pieces are contributed by the non-members such as ... 'Flu' by Margaret Thomas ..."

During World War II the Royal Academy Schools closed and Thomas moved to the Wiltshire countryside. She was inspired by nature, "I frequently return to the motif of a dying flower; I draw endless inspiration from these spiky, spectral and sculptural presences. When picked, flowers must be left alone to fulfil their destinies, to orientate to the light, to sort out their relative strengths, to stabilise and mature. They cannot be arranged. All this I seek to show in my paintings."

After the war Thomas built up a career with portrait commissions and solo exhibitions. Her first painting to be exhibited at the Royal Academy Summer Exhibition was Still Life of Norfolk Ham in 1943. She went on to exhibit at the Royal Academy for another 46 consecutive years. In 1947 she was elected a member of the Royal Society of British Artists, R.B.A. Her first solo exhibition was at the Leicester Galleries, London in 1949. Her work was "in a manner all of her own," exploring "the tonal subtleties of oil paint in various ways" and she arranged 'her flowers and still-life with unerring good taste.' In 1950 she was elected a member of the New English Art Club and in 1951 became a Fellow of the Royal Society of Arts. At an exhibition of sixteen painters at the R.B.A. Galleries in 1956 she was noted to have the most interesting pictures and that her larger pictures showed a 'remarkably subtle exact sense of tone and colour.'

Thomas showed in countless group exhibitions including: the New English Art Club; Royal Society of British Artists; Royal West of England Academy; Royal Scottish Academy; Women's International Art Club; Scottish Society of Women Artists; and, Aldeburgh 100. Thomas was a stalwart of the Women's International Art Club.

Thomas worked in London for many years and also maintained a second studio in Edinburgh from 1956. In 1984 she moved to a converted watermill in Ellingham, near Bungay in Suffolk. She died just before her 100th birthday on 27 March 2016.

== Awards ==
- 1971: De Lazlo Medal, Royal Society of British Artists
- 1981: Hunting Group Award, Oil Painting of the Year for The Rembrandt Drawing
- 1996: De Lazlo Medal, Royal Society of British Artists

== Collections ==
Her works are included in many UK public and private collections, including the following: Government Art Collection, Scottish National Gallery of Modern Art, Guildhall Art Gallery, Ferens Art Gallery, National Museum Wales (Outreach Collection), National Library of Wales, Royal West of England Academy, Trinity Hall, University of Cambridge, Charleston Farmhouse, Tullie House Museum and Art Gallery, Williamson Art Gallery and Museum, Paisley Museum and Art Galleries, Gregynog Hall, Greenway Estate (National Trust), Arts Council England Collection, City Art Centre (Edindurgh Council), Ingram Collection of Modern British Art, Stanley & Audrey Burton Gallery (University of Leeds), and Paintings in Hospitals.
