= Edgar Juillerat =

Swiss weightlifter

Personal information
- Nationality: Swiss
- Born: 1887
- Died: Unknown

Sport
- Sport: Weightlifting

Edgar Juillerat (born 1887, date of death unknown) was a Swiss weightlifter. He competed in the men's featherweight event at the 1924 Summer Olympics.
