= Helmut Schäfer =

German weightlifter

Helmut Schäfer (October 22, 1908 – July 30, 1994) was a German weightlifter who competed in the 1932 Summer Olympics. He was born in Stuttgart. In 1932 he finished fourth in the featherweight class.
