= Hendrik de Wolf =

Dutch weightlifter (1893–1955)

Personal information
- Nationality: Dutch
- Born: 21 August 1893 Oegstgeest, Netherlands
- Died: 10 December 1955 (aged 62) Haarlem, Netherlands

Sport
- Sport: Weightlifting

Hendrik de Wolf (21 August 1893 – 10 December 1955) was a Dutch weightlifter. He competed in the men's featherweight event at the 1928 Summer Olympics.
