= Aleksander Kask (weightlifter) =

Estonian weightlifter

Personal information
- Nationality: Estonian
- Born: 21 August 1902; Sindi, Estonia
- Died: 31 March 1965 (aged 62); Sindi, Estonia

Sport
- Sport: Weightlifting

Aleksander Kask (21 August 1902 – 31 March 1965) was an Estonian weightlifter. He competed in the men's featherweight event at the 1928 Summer Olympics.
