= Hans Schwarz (artist) =

Austrian artist (1922–2003)

- Born: 29 December 1922; Vienna, Austria
- Died: 28 May 2003 (aged 80); Greenwich, London
- Known for: Portrait painting
- Spouse(s): Lena Jones (m. 1943); 2 sons

Hans Schwarz (29 December 1922 – 28 May 2003), was a prolific Austrian artist, who spent most of his life in Britain and was notable for his portrait painting, several examples of which are held by the National Portrait Gallery in London. Schwarz was Jewish and was forced to leave Austria in 1938 when the Nazis took over and he went into exile in Britain.

== Biography ==
Schwarz was born in Vienna to Jewish parents. His mother died when he was 12 years old, two years before he entered art school in Vienna. With the Anschluss, in 1938, Schwarz was forced to abandon his studies. Shortly, afterwards he left Austria aboard a Kindertransport and made his way to England. His father, a bank clerk, failed to escape Vienna and later was murdered in the Auschwitz concentration camp.

Arriving in England, the young Schwarz worked as a labourer for a year at Bournville, before he was interned on the Isle of Man as an enemy alien. When he was released from internment in 1941, Schwarz enrolled at the Birmingham College of Art and studied there until 1943. Schwarz then spent two years working in a commercial art studio before, when the Second World War ended, establishing himself as a freelance commercial illustrator. He completed several murals for public buildings and also some work for the 1951 Festival of Britain. For almost twenty years Schwarz worked for several high-profile clients, including Shell, the Post Office and BOAC, until in 1964 he decided to concentrate full-time on his painting and sculpture. In 1966 Schwarz and his family moved to Somerset, from Hampstead, where he expanded the range of his work, painting more landscapes, undertaking more sculptures and using watercolours for the first time.

From 1970 until his death, Schwarz lived and worked in Greenwich and produced some of his finest work at his studio there. In 1984 the National Portrait Gallery commissioned Schwarz to produce a group portrait of several trade union leaders. The resulting picture of Joe Gormley, Sid Weighell and Tom Jackson in Trafalgar Square with pigeons flying around them is possibly his best known work. Other notable portraits by Schwarz from this period include depictions of Janet Suzman, Nikolaus Pevsner and the poet Ivor Cutler. From Greenwich, Schwarz painted several urban landscapes often featuring the streets in his immediate vicinity but also Canary Wharf and the Isle of Dogs. Schwarz wrote several books on artistic techniques and, with his wife Lena, a book on the Halesowen district of the West Midlands.

In 1981, Schwarz won the Hunting Art Prize for a watercolour painting. Throughout the 1980s and 1990s he held a number of well-received exhibitions at commercial galleries. These included a series at the Thackeray Gallery and individual shows at the Compton Gallery in 1983, the Ben Uri Gallery in 1985, the Woodlands Art Gallery in 1991, the Sternberg Centre in 1992 and the New Academy Gallery in both 1995 and 2001. The auction house Bonhams sold the contents of his studio in 2004.

== Published works ==
- The Halesowen Story, 1955, with Lena Schwarz
- Figure Painting, 1967
- Colour for the Artist, 1968
- Painting in Towns and Cities, 1969
- Draw in Pencil, 1979
- Draw Buildings and Cityscapes, 1980
- Draw Sketches, 1981
- Draw Transport, 1982, writing as V.Gibbs

== Memberships ==
Schwarz was a member or affiliated with the following organisations:

- the Royal Watercolour Society,
- Royal Society of British Artists
- Royal Society of Portrait Painters
- New English Art Club
- Contemporary Portrait Society
- Chelsea Art Society
- Hampstead Artists Council
