= Henri Baudrand =

French weightlifter

Personal information
- Nationality: French
- Born: 21 December 1902 Lyon, France
- Died: 13 August 1993 (aged 90) Lyon, France

Sport
- Sport: Weightlifting

Henri Baudrand (21 December 1902 – 13 August 1993) was a French weightlifter. He competed in the men's featherweight event at the 1928 Summer Olympics. He placed 7th overall among 21 competitors.
