= Weightlifting at the 1928 Summer Olympics =

Coordinates: 52.3444°N 4.8560°E

Weightlifting at the Games of the IX Olympiad
- Weightlifting pictogram
- Venue: Krachtsportgebouw
- Date: 28–29 July 1928
- No. of events: 5 (5 men, 0 women)
- Competitors: 92 from 19 nations

The weightlifting competition at the 1928 Summer Olympics in Amsterdam consisted of five weight classes, all for men only. The competitions were held on Saturday, 28 July 1928, and on Sunday, 29 July 1928.

== Medal summary ==
Games	Gold	Silver	Bronze
Featherweight –60 kg	Franz Andrysek; Austria	Pierino Gabetti; Italy	Hans Wölpert; Germany
Lightweight –67.5 kg	Hans Haas; Austria	none awarded	Fernand Arnout; France
Lightweight –67.5 kg	Kurt Helbig; Germany	none awarded	Fernand Arnout; France
Middleweight –75 kg	Roger François; France	Carlo Galimberti; Italy	Guus Scheffer; Netherlands
Light heavyweight –82.5 kg	El Sayed Nosseir; Egypt	Louis Hostin; France	Jan Verheijen; Netherlands
Heavyweight +82.5 kg	Josef Strassberger; Germany	Arnold Luhaäär; Estonia	Jaroslav Skobla; Czechoslovakia

== Participating nations ==
Every nation was allowed to participate with a maximum of two weightlifters in every event. Five nations entered the maximum of ten competitors.

A total of 92 weightlifters from 19 nations competed at the Amsterdam Games:

- Argentina (2)
- Austria (10)
- Belgium (8)
- Czechoslovakia (6)
- Denmark (1)
- Egypt (2)
- Estonia (4)
- France (10)
- Germany (10)
- Great Britain (5)

- Italy (6)
- Latvia (1)
- Lithuania (1)
- Luxembourg (3)
- Netherlands (10)
- Portugal (1)
- Sweden (2)
- Switzerland (10)
- Turkey (1)

== Medal table ==
Rank	Nation	Gold	Silver	Bronze	Total
1	Germany	2	0	1	3
2	Austria	2	0	0	2
3	France	1	1	1	3
4	Egypt	1	0	0	1
5	Italy	0	2	0	2
6	Estonia	0	1	0	1
7	Netherlands	0	0	2	2
8	Czechoslovakia	0	0	1	1
Totals (8 entries)		6	4	5	15

== Sources ==
- "Olympic Medal Winners". International Olympic Committee.
