= Gustav Ernesaks (weightlifter) =

Estonian weightlifter

Gustav Ernesaks (2 August 1896, Harjumaa, Governorate of Estonia – 2 September 1932, Sydney, Australia) was an Estonian weightlifter.

== Achievements ==
Year	Tournament	Venue	Result	Event	Points
1922	World Championships	Tallinn, Estonia	3rd	Weightlifting −?? kg	?
1924	Olympic Games	Paris, France	6th	Weightlifting −60 kg	372.5
