= Henry Kondracki =

Scottish artist (born 1953)

Henry Kondracki (born 1953) is a Scottish artist based in Edinburgh. He studied at the Byam Shaw School of Art, London and the Slade School of Fine Art, London (1982–1986). He has received the Cheltenham Drawing Prize (1999), the Hunting Art Prize (2004) and has twice been the recipient of the Slade Fine Art Prize. His work has been widely exhibited in the U.K and abroad.

A dozen of his oil paintings are in UK public collections, including Glasgow Museums and Manchester City Art Gallery.
