= Richard Bachtell =

American weightlifter (1906–1990)

Richard Earl Bachtell Sr (October 27, 1906 – November 28, 1990) was an American weightlifter who competed in the 1932 Summer Olympics. He was born in Cheeseville, Wisconsin. In 1932 he finished sixth in the featherweight class.

He was also a USA Senior National Champion (1929-1931, 1934, 1935, and 1937). In 1988 he was inducted into the Washington County Sports Hall of Fame.

Later in life, Richard resided in York, Pennsylvania. He was an avid vintner and beekeeper, making homemade wine and honey in his cellar. His son, Richard Bachtell Jr., was born and raised in York, Pennsylvania.
