= Giuseppe Conca =

Italian weightlifter

Giuseppe Conca (10 March 1904 – 3 October 1972) was an Italian weightlifter who competed in the 1924 and 1928 Summer Olympics. In 1924 he finished 18th in the featherweight class. Four years later he finished fourth in the featherweight class at the Amsterdam Games.
