= Henri Rivière (weightlifter) =

French weightlifter (1906–1984)

Personal information
- Nationality: French
- Born: 29 December 1906; Montrichard, France
- Died: 16 September 1984 (aged 77); Tours, France

Sport
- Sport: Weightlifting

Henri Rivière (29 December 1906 – 16 September 1984) was a French weightlifter. He competed in the men's featherweight event at the 1928 Summer Olympics, placing 10th among 21 weightlifters. Rivière died in Tours on 16 September 1984, at the age of 77.
