= Nicholas Charles Williams =

English painter

Nicholas Charles Williams (born 1961) is an English painter and draughtsman. Born in Surrey, he trained at Richmond College, London. His work aims to examine aspects of human behaviour, conveyed through symbolism and direct observational painting. He has been the subject of solo shows at various galleries, including the Russell-Cotes Museum, Bournemouth, Royal Cornwall Museum, Truro Cathedral, and Liverpool Cathedral for European Capital of Culture 2008. In 2001 he was awarded the Hunting Art Prize and in 2008 shortlisted for the Threadneedle Figurative Prize.

Search III was awarded the 2001 Hunting Art Prize

Williams now lives and works in Cornwall, South West England and is a lifelong surfer. His studio is a former lifeboat station on the North coast of Cornwall.

== Hockney–Falco thesis ==
Two paintings that Williams made for scientific analysis examining David Hockney's thesis on the use of optics by the Old Masters, have been presented in numerous lectures at major academic institutions and galleries throughout Europe and the USA. Presentations (led by Dr. David G. Stork) have taken place at Metropolitan Museum of Art; The Venice Biennale; The Louvre; National Gallery, London; Kunsthistorisches Museum, Vienna; de Young Museum, San Francisco; Oxford University; Cambridge University; Stanford University; Getty Research Institute; and the Museum of Modern Art, New York.

== Collections ==
- British Museum
- Bournemouth Central Public Library
- Bluestone Design, Plymouth
- Falmouth Art Gallery
- Frissiras Museum in Athens
- Hunting PLC, London

== Selected bibliography ==
- 1995 Daily Telegraph, Mail on Sunday, Sunday Express
- 2001 Art Review, London Evening Standard, Financial Times, Galleries
- 2003 Daily Telegraph, Hunting Art Prizes 25th Anniversary Catalogue: William Packer
- 2004 New York Times, Sunday Herald, Scotland
- 2006 Madame Figaro Voyage Japon

== Critical reception ==
William Packer, art critic: “Nicholas Charles Williams is one of British Art's well-kept secrets. even so his reputations is growing fast as both one of the most accomplished figurative artist of his generation, and one of the most unusual. Indeed there is no one else that I can think of who places himself quite so firmly in the great tradition of early Baroque, yet with no sense of anachronism or pastiche.”

Ian Dejardin, Director, Dulwich Picture Gallery: "Williams may paint like a modern-day Counter-Reformation artist, but his subject matter is worlds away and unique to him, visually and intellectually gripping."

Brian Sewell, art critic: "The quality of the painting seemed to me astounding".

Mark Bills, Curator of Paintings Prints & Drawings, Museum of London: "An artist who has such a comfortable and informed relationship with the art of the past...he is able to draw on a large number of sources to produce fresh and vibrant images drawn and explored with consummate skill....they emerge from observation and the intimacy of the artist with his subject."
