= Nick Williams (academic) =

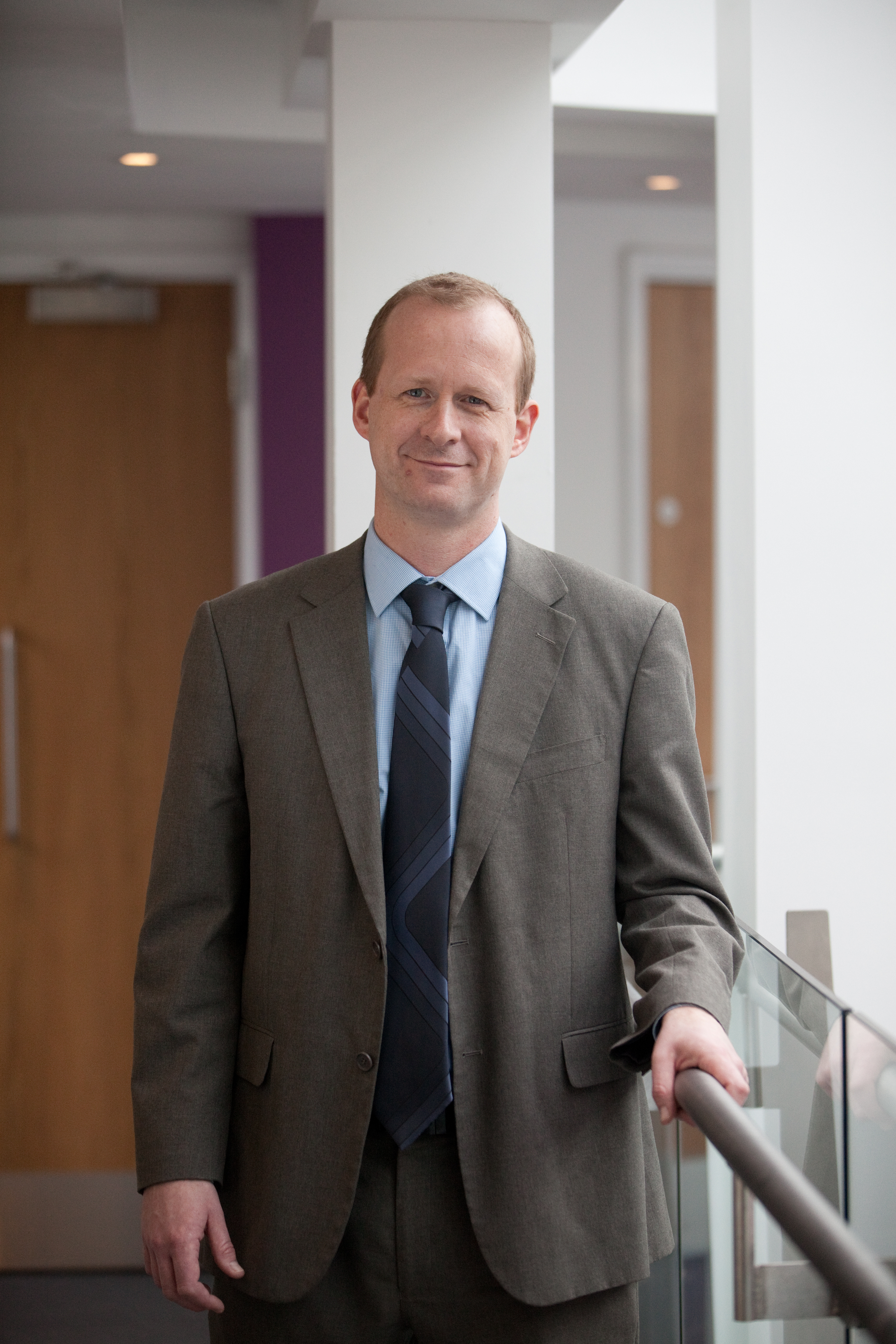

Nicholas Edward Williams is an entrepreneurship and economic development scholar at the University of Leeds Business School where he is Professor in Enterprise. He is based at the Centre Enterprise and Entrepreneurship Studies where he is Director of the Research in Enterprise and Entrepreneurship Studies (REES) group.

Williams' research interests centre on entrepreneurship and economic development, including entrepreneurship in crisis economies, new born states and transition countries. He is also interested in enterprise policy and economic resilience.
