= Maurice Martin (weightlifter) =

French weightlifter

Personal information
- Nationality: French
- Born: 18 November 1884

Sport
- Sport: Weightlifting

Maurice Martin (born 18 November 1884, date of death unknown) was a French weightlifter. He competed in the men's featherweight event at the 1924 Summer Olympics, where he placed 4th.
