= Raymond Suvigny =

French weightlifter

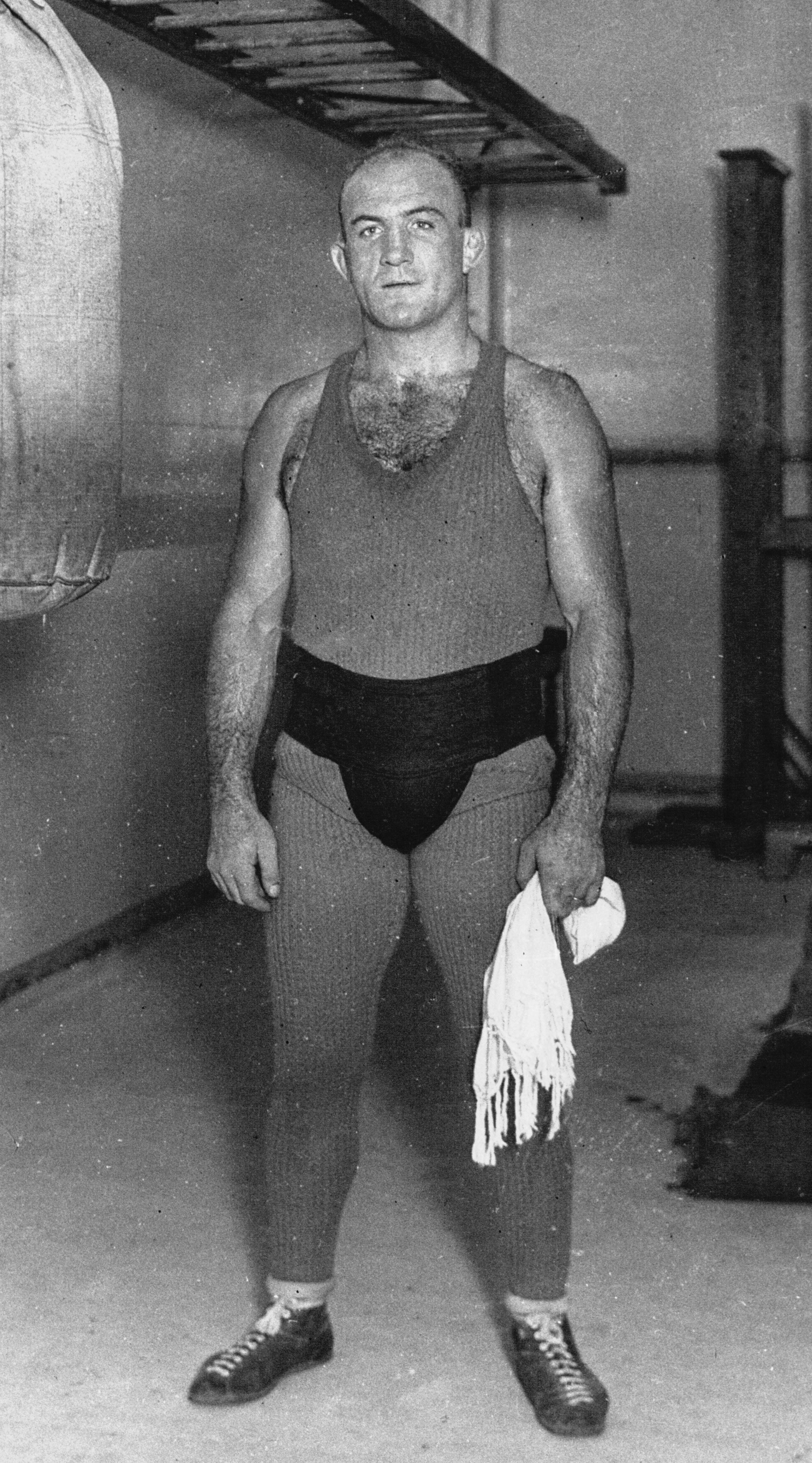
- Raymond Suvigny in 1932

Personal information
- Born: 21 January 1903 Paris, France
- Died: 26 October 1945 (aged 42) Paris, France
- Weight: 59 kg (130 lb)

Sport
- Sport: Weightlifting
- Club: US Métro
Medal record
Representing France
Olympic Games
Gold medal – first place	1932 Los Angeles	-60 kg

Raymond Suvigny (21 January 1903 – 26 October 1945) was a French weightlifter. He competed at the 1924 and 1932 Olympics and won a gold medal in 1932.

Suvigny took up weightlifting in 1919 while working at the Paris Métro. In 1924 he showed world-level results, but placed only ninth at the 1924 Summer Olympics due to an injury. He came to prominence in 1926, when he won his first national title and set two unofficial world records. He retired after winning the 1932 Olympic gold medal. During World War II he was kept as a prisoner of war and died in a liberated Paris in October 1945.
