= Sigfrid Hylander =

Swedish weightlifter

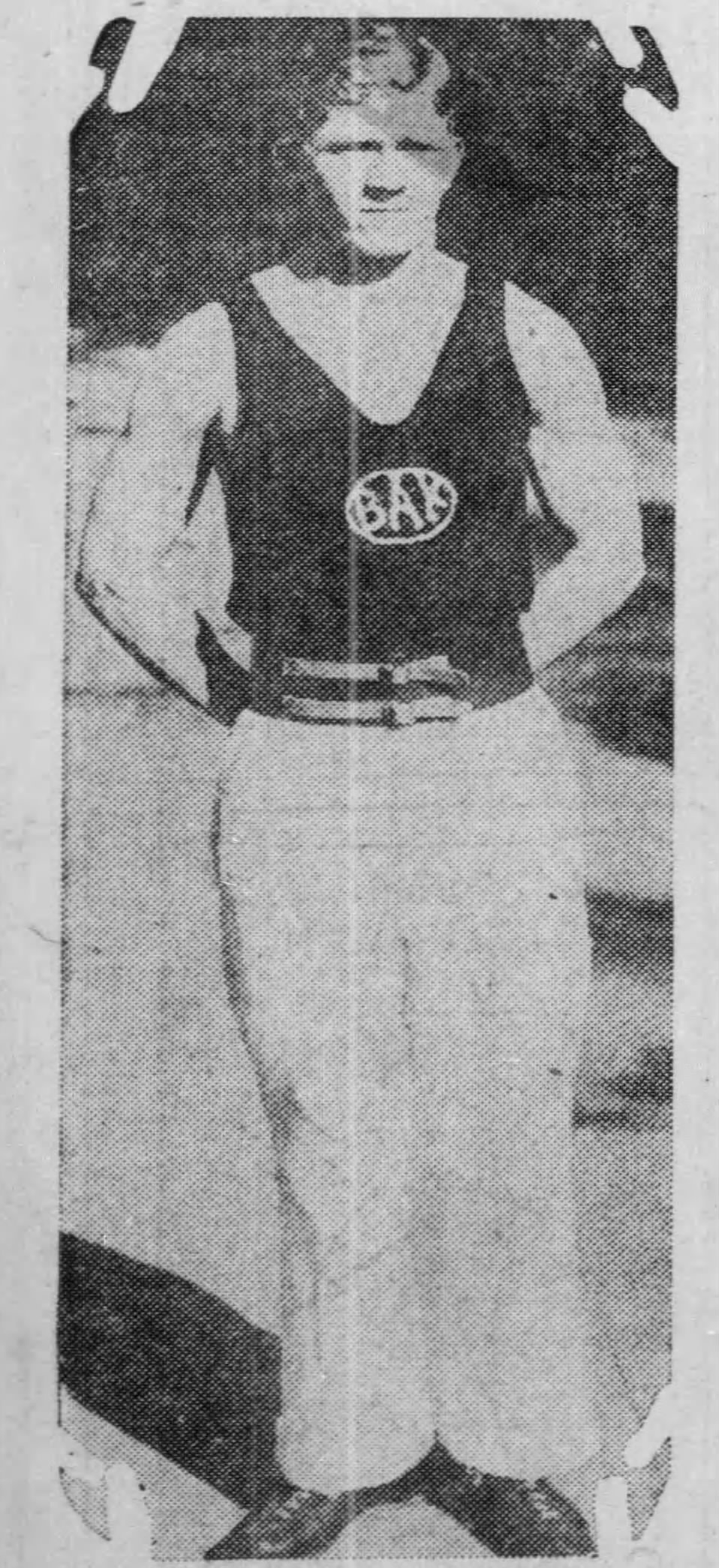
- Hylander in 1924

Personal information
- Nationality: Swedish
- Born: 5 December 1902; Borås, Sweden
- Died: 17 August 1978 (aged 75); Borås, Sweden

Sport
- Sport: Weightlifting

Sigfrid Hylander (5 December 1902 – 17 August 1978) was a Swedish weightlifter. He competed in the men's featherweight event at the 1924 Summer Olympics.
