= Hans Wölpert =

German weightlifter

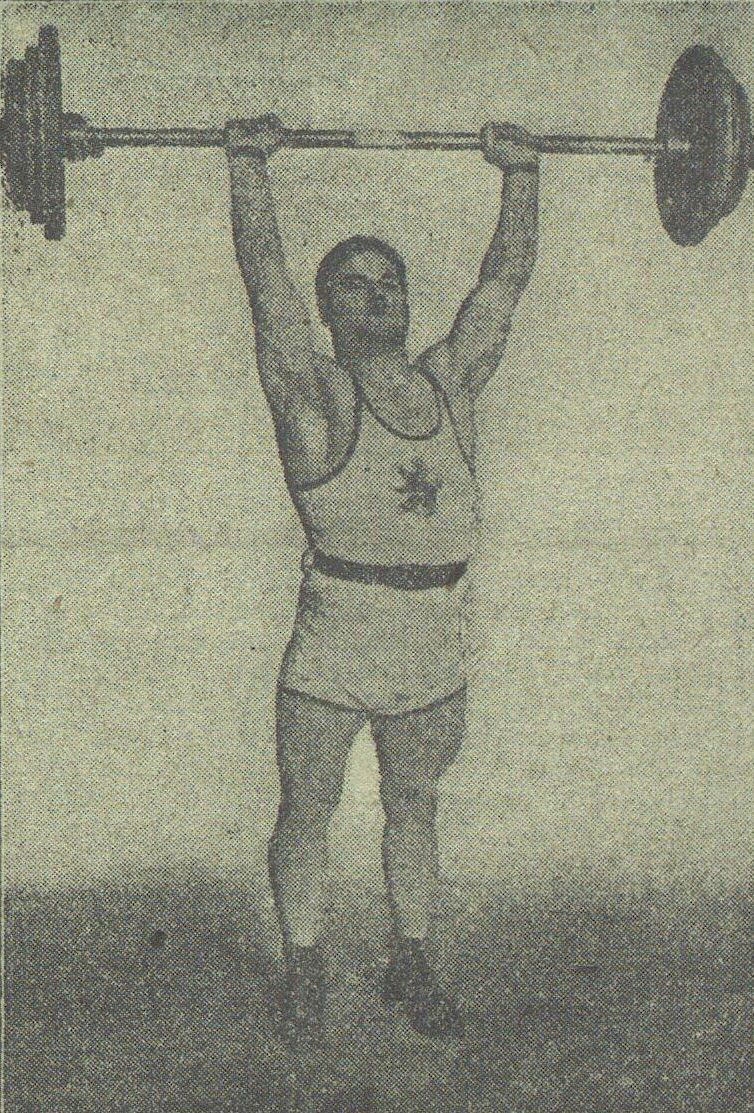

Medal record

Men's weightlifting

Representing Germany

Olympic Games
Silver medal – second place	1932 Los Angeles	-60 kg
Bronze medal – third place	1928 Amsterdam	-60 kg

Johannes "Hans" Wölpert (30 September 1898 – 1 January 1957) was a German weightlifter who competed in the 1928 and 1932 Summer Olympics. He was born in Munich. In 1928 he won the bronze medal in the featherweight class. The Featherweight competition was held at the Krachtsportgebouw and 21 athletes participated in the event. Four years later at the 1932 Games he won the silver medal in the featherweight class.
