= Wilhelm Rosinek =

Austrian weightlifter

Personal information
- Nationality: Austrian
- Born: 5 September 1901
- Died: 25 November 1962 (aged 61)

Sport
- Sport: Weightlifting

Wilhelm Rosinek (5 September 1901 – 25 November 1962) was an Austrian weightlifter. He competed in the men's featherweight event at the 1924 Summer Olympics, where he placed 5th in a field of 21 competitors.
