= Cemal Erçman =

Turkish weightlifter

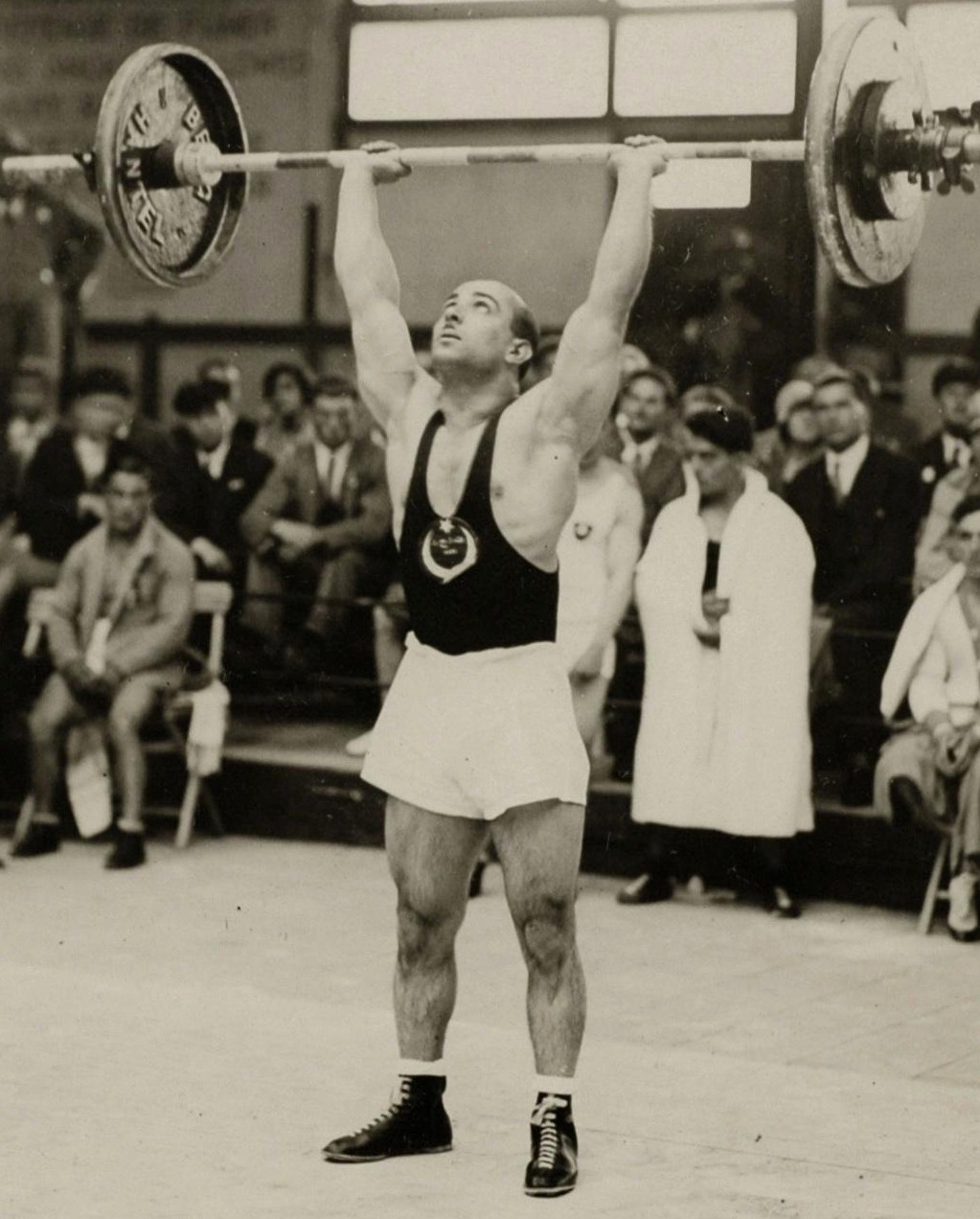
Cemal Erçman at the 1928 Olympics

Cemal Erçman (1896/1904–?), also known as Gülleci Cemal, was a Turkish weightlifter, who competed at the 1924 and 1928 Olympic Games.

He lifted 345 kg in total at the 1924 Olympic Games held in Paris, France and placed 14th among 22 competitors in the featherweight class. At the next Olympics in Amsterdam, Netherlands, he achieved the 8th rank with 262.5 kg in total in the men's featherweight event, against a field of 21 competitors. These were Turkey's first successes in the weightlifting sport at international arenas.

Cemal Erçman was among the founders of Istanbul Jimnastik Kulübü. He continued performing active sports through his later life, was engaged in bodybuilding, and competed in 1968 aged 72.
