= Franz Andrysek =

Austrian weightlifter (1906–1981)

Franz Josef Andrysek
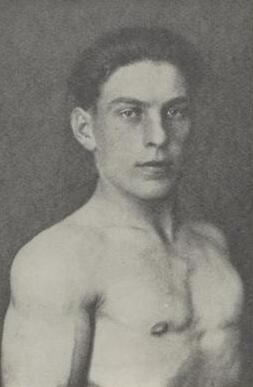
- Franz Andrysek in 1928

Personal information
- Born: 8 February 1906 Vienna, Austria
- Died: 9 February 1981 (aged 75) Vienna, Austria

Sport
- Sport: Weightlifting
Medal record
Representing Austria
Olympic Games
| Gold medal – first place | 1928 Amsterdam | -60 kg |

Franz Josef Andrysek (8 February 1906 – 9 February 1981) was an Austrian weightlifter who competed in the 1924 Summer Olympics and in the 1928 Summer Olympics.

He was born and died in Vienna. In 1924 he finished 18th in the featherweight class. Four years later at the 1928 Games he won the gold medal in the men's featherweight event.
