= Gus Cummins =

British weightlifter

Personal information
- Full name: Augustine James Cummins
- Nationality: British
- Born: 27 October 1886
- Died: 1967 (aged 80–81)

Sport
- Sport: Weightlifting

Augustine James Cummins (27 October 1886 – 1967) was a British weightlifter. He competed in the men's featherweight event at the 1924 Summer Olympics.
