= Krachtsportgebouw =

Multi-purpose sports arena located in Amsterdam, Netherlands

Coordinates: 52.343196°N 4.856771°E

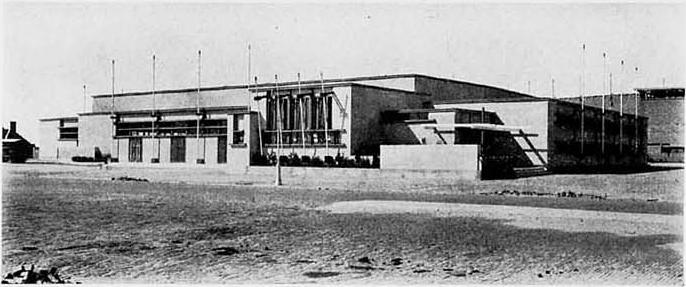
Strength Sports Hall for the 9th Olympiad, Amsterdam

Krachtsportgebouw (Dutch pronunciation: [ˌkrɑxtspɔrtxəˈbʌu]; "strength sport building") was a multi-purpose sports arena located in Amsterdam, Netherlands. Known during the 1928 Summer Olympics as the Wrestling Pavilion, it hosted the wrestling, boxing, and weightlifting events.

Krachtsportgebouw was designed by architect Jan Wils. It could accommodate 2,840 people seated and 1,794 standing and included a shower, 15 dressing rooms, and an administrative office.
