= Albert Maes =

Belgian weightlifter

Personal information
- Nationality: Belgian
- Born: 23 October 1906; Antwerp, Belgium
- Died: 27 October 1986 (aged 80); Merksem, Belgium

Sport
- Sport: Weightlifting

Albert Maes (23 October 1906 – 27 October 1986) was a Belgian weightlifter. He competed in the featherweight category (under 60 kg) at the 1924 Summer Olympics and the 1928 Summer Olympics.
