= Pierino Gabetti =

Italian weightlifter (1904–1971)

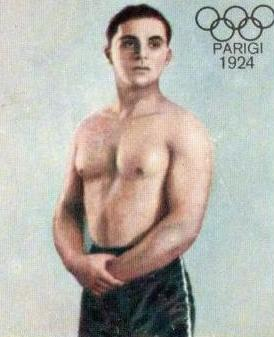

Personal information
- Born: 22 May 1904 Sestri Ponente, Genoa, Italy
- Died: 28 February 1971 (aged 66) Cogoleto, Genoa, Italy

Sport
- Sport: Weightlifting
Medal record
Representing Italy
Olympic Games
| Gold medal – first place | 1924 Paris | -60 kg |
| Silver medal – second place | 1928 Amsterdam | -60 kg |

Pierino Gabetti (22 May 1904 – 28 February 1971) was an Italian weightlifter who won Olympic gold in the men's featherweight (60 kg) event at the 1924 Summer Olympics and silver at the 1928 Summer Olympics.

== Biography ==
Gabetti was born in Sestri Ponente (Genoa). He competed at three Olympic Games (1924, 1928 and 1932).

At the 1924 Paris Games, he won the featherweight title. He returned four years later to win silver in the same weight class at Amsterdam 1928, and placed fourth in the lightweight class at the 1932 Olympics.

=== Records and other competition ===
Italian sources credit Gabetti with seven national titles (four at featherweight and three at lightweight). The Italian Weightlifting Federation also reports two IWF-recognized world records in the snatch in 1927 (90 kg and 92.5 kg), achieved in Milan. Olympics.com states he set three featherweight world records from 1927–28 (two in the snatch and one in the total).

FIPE records Gabetti competing at three European Championships, placing fourth (1930), seventh (1931) and fifth (1934).

=== Later life ===
According to FIPE, after World War II he served as national head coach (Commissario Tecnico Nazionale) from 1955 to 1961. FIPE also lists multiple Italian sporting honors awarded to him later in life, including a CONI Valore Atletico gold medal (1965).

Gabetti died on 28 February 1971 in Cogoleto, in the Genoa area.
