= Alfred Baxter (weightlifter) =

British weightlifter (1898–1983)

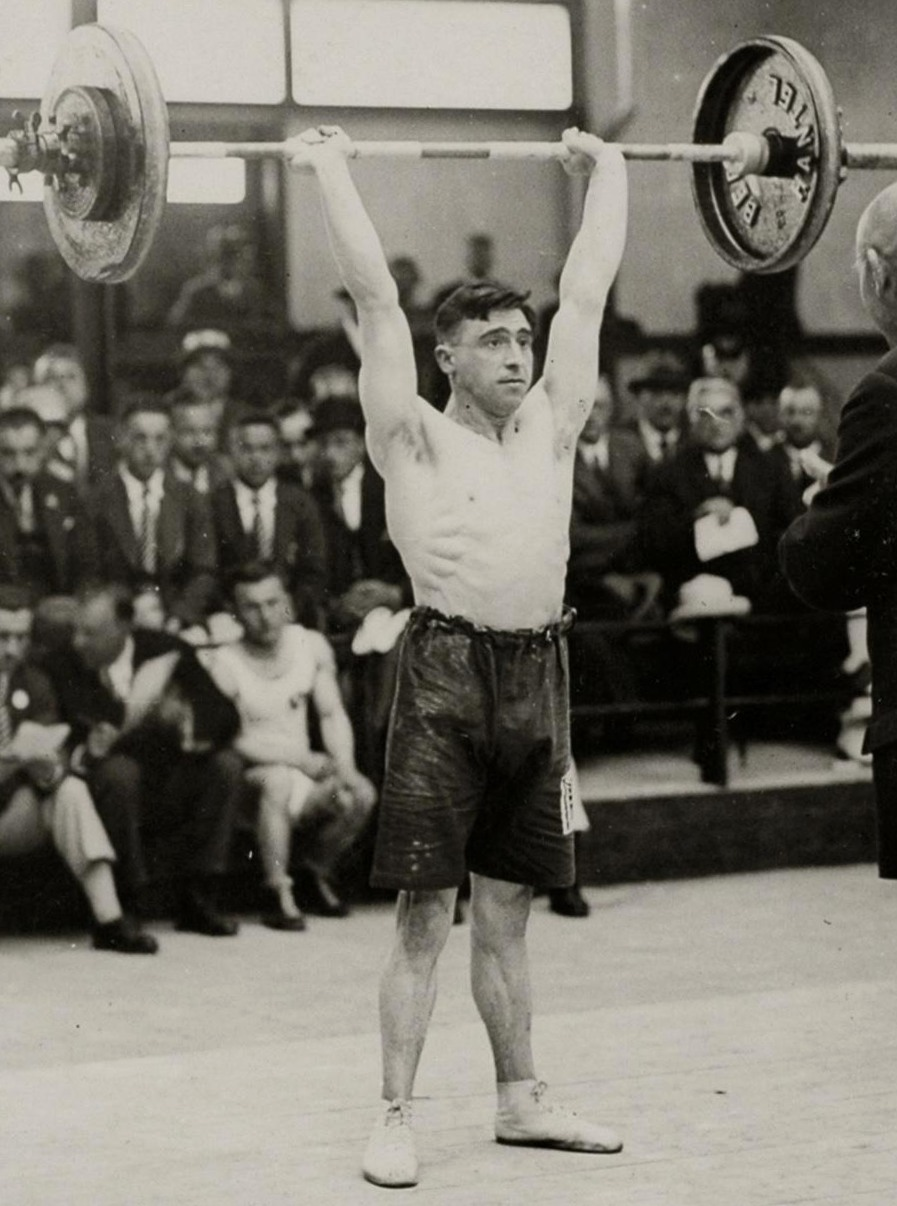
- Alfred Baxter at the 1928 Olympics

Personal information
- Born: 5 June 1898 Delph, Yorkshire, UK
- Died: 8 January 1983 (aged 84) Oldham, Lancashire, UK

Sport
- Sport: Weightlifting

Alfred Baxter (5 June 1898 – 8 January 1983) was a British weightlifter. He competed at the 1924 and 1928 Summer Olympics in the featherweight category (under 60 kg) and his overall standing was 7th and 18th, respectively.
