= List of United States men's national weightlifting champions =

This is a list of the men's American weightlifting champions since 1928.

== National Champions (1973-2025) ==
As of 28 June 2025

Athlete	Weight class	Year	Hometown/Team	Total
Gabe Chhum	60 kg	2025	Max Kane Barbell	270 kg
Christopher Camenares	65 kg	2025	Philadelphia Barbell	236 kg
Hampton Morris	71 kg	2025	Unaffiliated	324 kg
Ryan Grimsland	79 kg	2025	Unaffiliated	339 kg
Brandon Victorian	88 kg	2025	BlueWave Weightlifting	350 kg
Chrisanto D'agostino	94 kg	2025	East Coast Gold	343 kg
Xavier Borde	110 kg	2025	Alee Athletics	359 kg
Dimitri Albury	+110 kg	2025	Rising Tide Weightlifting	364 kg
Mark Chavez	55 kg	2024	Florida Elite	187 kg
Christopher Camenares	61 kg	2024	Philadelphia Barbell	240 kg
Michael Mo	67 kg	2024	Murder of Crows	262 kg
Matthew McCullough	73 kg	2024	Team Texas	300 kg
Preston Powell	81 kg	2024	Power and Grace Performance	333 kg
Brandon Victorian	89 kg	2024	BlueWave Weightlifting	331 kg
Chrisanto D'agostino	96 kg	2024	East Coast Gold	345 kg
Morgan McCullough	102 kg	2024	California Strength	348 kg
Kolbi Ferguson	109 kg	2024	Atlas Weightlifting Club	381 kg
Aaron Williams	+109 kg	2024	Bexar Barbell	406 kg
Gabe Chhum	61 kg	2023	Max Kane Barbell	270 kg
Hampton Morris	67 kg	2023	Unaffiliated	298 kg
Travis Cooper	73 kg	2023	Rising Tide Weightlifting	309 kg
Edward Ginnan	81 kg	2023	Myriad Weightlifting	321 kg
Brandon Victorian	89 kg	2023	Blue Wave Weightlifting	342 kg
Layne Palm	96 kg	2023	Bexar Barbell	334 kg
Trevor Kimm	102 kg	2023	Unaffiliated	325 kg
Kolbi Ferguson	109 kg	2023	Atlas Weightlifting Club	362 kg
Keiser Witte	+109 kg	2023	Alee Athletics	412 kg
Howard Roche Cintron	55 kg	2022	Florida Elite	226 kg
Hampton Morris	61 kg	2022	Unaffiliated	282 kg
Matthew McCullough	67 kg	2022	Texas A&M	280 kg
Jacob Horst	73 kg	2022	Garage Strength	312 kg
Ryan Grimsland	81 kg	2022	Unaffiliated	330 kg
Nathan Damron	89 kg	2022	California Strength	360 kg
Trevor Kimm	96 kg	2022	Unaffiliated	333 kg
Wes Kitts	102 kg	2022	California Strength	370 kg
Nathan Lewis	109 kg	2022	1Kilo	343 kg
Alejandro Medina	+109 kg	2022	Florida Elite	375 kg
Howard Roche Cintron	55 kg	2021	Middle Georgia Weightlifting	211 kg
Hampton Morris	61 kg	2021	Unattached	271 kg
Ryan Grimsland	67 kg	2021	Unattached	296 kg
Clarence Cummings	73 kg	2021	Team Divergent	315 kg
Harrison Maurus	81 kg	2021	Power and Grace Performance	350 kg
Beau Brown	89 kg	2021	Heartland Strength	334 kg
Jason Bonnick	96 kg	2021	Florida Elite	343 kg
Ryan Sester	102 kg	2021	Heroic Barbell	352 kg
Ian Wilson	109 kg	2021	Hassle Free BBC	380 kg
Caine Wilkes	+109 kg	2021	Unattached	394 kg
Carlos Millen	61 kg	2020	Coastal Empire Weightlifting	239 kg
Jacob Horst	67 kg	2020	Garage Strength	291 kg
Clarence Cummings	73 kg	2020	Team Divergent	330 kg
Harrison Maurus	81 kg	2020	Power and Grace Performance	335 kg
Travis Cooper	89 kg	2020	East Coast Gold	328 kg
Nathan Damron	96 kg	2020	California Strength	366 kg
Thomas Duer	102 kg	2020	East Coast Gold	330 kg
Wes Kitts	109 kg	2020	California Strength	375 kg
Keiser Witte	+109 kg	2020	Alee Athletics	390 kg
Don Abrahamson	67.5 kg	1978	Maitland, FL	260 kg
Don Abrahamson	67.5 kg	1982		285 kg
Don Abrahamson	67.5 kg	1984	Sports Palace	275 kg
Aaron Adams	62 kg	2006		246 kg
Aaron Adams	62 kg	2008	Unattached	250 kg
Aaron Adams	62 kg	2009	LSU-Shreveport	259 kg
Val Balison	82.5 kg	1981		327.5 kg
Steve Barlett	52 kg	1985		170 kg
Darren Barnes	56 kg	2010	Lift For Life	211 kg
Darren Barnes	56 kg	2012	East Coast Gold	221 kg
Darren Barnes	56 kg	2015	East Coast Gold	242 kg
Darren Barnes	56 kg	2016	East Coast Gold	240 kg
Darrel Barnes	62 kg	2012	East Coast Gold	251 kg
Darrel Barnes	62 kg	2018	East Coast Gold	245 kg
Joshua Barnett	56 kg	2009	Team Florida Altamonte	190 kg
Wes Barnett	100 kg	1992	Wesley	350 kg
Wes Barnett	99 kg	1993	Wesley	345 kg
Wes Barnett	108 kg	1994	Wesley	360 kg
Wes Barnett	108 kg	1995	Wesley	370 kg
Wes Barnett	108 kg	1997	Wesley	375.5 kg
Wes Barnett	105 kg	1999	Wesley	380 kg
Bob Bednarski	110 kg	1973	York Barbell Club	340 kg
Jim Benjamin	67.5 kg	1977		255 kg
John Bergman	+110 kg	1986	Sports Palace	372.5 kg
Angelo Bianco	77 kg	2017	Average Broz Gymnasium	320 kg
Sam Bigler	82.5 kg	1976		320 kg
Robert Blackwell	89 kg	2019	California Strength	329 kg
Ray Blaha	110 kg	1977		337.5 kg
Ryan Borges	56 kg	2013	Team Florida Gulf Coast	218 kg
Brett Brian	90 kg	1988	Gayle Hatch	325 kg
Brett Brian	90 kg	1991	Gayle Hatch	342.5 kg
Brett Brian	90 kg	1992	Baton Rouge, LA	342.5 kg
Henry Brower	69 kg	2003	Team Savannah	282.5 kg
Henry Brower	69 kg	2004	Team Savannah	275 kg
Henry Brower	69 kg	2005	Team Savannah	280 kg
Henry Brower	69 kg	2006	Team Savannah	285.5 kg
Henry Brower	69 kg	2008	Team Savannah	293 kg
Henry Brower	69 kg	2009	Team Savannah	287 kg
Henry Brower	69 kg	2010	Team Savannah	268 kg
Matt Bruce	77 kg	2006	Gayle Hatch Weightlifters	327 kg
Casey Burgener	+105 kg	2006	Team Southern California	383 kg
Casey Burgener	+105 kg	2007	Team Southern California	390 kg
Casey Burgener	105 kg	2010	Team CrossFit	357 kg
Colin Burns	94 kg	2014	Texas Barbell	359 kg
Colin Burns	94 kg	2017	Team Juggernaut	369 kg
Mark Cameron	110 kg	1975		365 kg
Mark Cameron	110 kg	1976		385 kg
Mark Cameron	100 kg	1977		355 kg
Mark Cameron	110 kg	1978	York, PA	370 kg
Mark Cameron	110 kg	1979		385 kg
Mark Cameron	110 kg	1980		372.5 kg
Dan Cantore	67.5 kg	1973	Golden Gate	272.5 kg
Dan Cantore	67.5 kg	1974		287.5 kg
Dan Cantore	67.5 kg	1975		275 kg
Dan Cantore	67.5 kg	1976		285 kg
Guy Carlton	110 kg	1981		360 kg
Guy Carlton	110 kg	1984		362.5 kg
Jim Chaplin	69 kg	2002	Team Savannah	267.5 kg
Oscar Chaplin, III	70 kg	1997	Team Savannah	297.5 kg
Oscar Chaplin, III	77 kg	1998	Team Savannah	312.5 kg
Oscar Chaplin, III	77 kg	1999	Team Savannah	325 kg
Oscar Chaplin, III	77 kg	2000	Team Savannah	332.5 kg
Oscar Chaplin, III	85 kg	2002	Team Savannah	347.5 kg
Oscar Chaplin, III	85 kg	2004	Team Savannah	320 kg
Jon Chappell	52 kg	1979		177.5 kg
Ken Clark	100 kg	1981		350 kg
Ken Clark	100 kg	1982		367.5 kg
Ken Clark	100 kg	1983		370 kg
Ken Clark	100 kg	1984		360 kg
Ken Clark	100 kg	1985		355 kg
Ken Clark	100 kg	1987		337.5 kg
Michael Cohen	90 kg	1983		352.5 kg
Michael Cohen	90 kg	1986		332.5 kg
Tommy Colandro	90 kg	1987		335 kg
Travis Cooper	85 kg	2013	Muscle Driver USA	341 kg
Travis Cooper	77 kg	2015	Muscle Driver USA	327 kg
Travis Cooper	77 kg	2016	Unattached	326 kg
Travis Cooper	77 kg	2018	East Coast Gold	295 kg
Travis Cooper	81 kg	2019	East Coast Gold	318 kg
Dave Conragan	91 kg	1997	Unattached	300 kg
Derrick Crass	82.5 kg	1987		310 kg
Derrick Crass	90 kg	1989		340 kg
Derrick Crass	90 kg	1990		345 kg
Ron Crawley	52 kg	1978	Washington, DC	175 kg
Ron Crawley	56 kg	1983		200 kg
CJ Cummings	69 kg	2015	Team Savannah	306 kg
James Butch Curry, Jr	90 kg	1979		325 kg
James Butch Curry, Jr	90 kg	1980		337.5 kg
Nathan Damron	94 kg	2018	Mash Mafia	350 kg
Nathan Damron	96 kg	2019	Mash Mafia	357 kg
Myron Davis	75 kg	1980		297.5 kg
Brian Derwin	100 kg	1980		362.5 kg
Matthew Devine	94 kg	2009	East Coast Gold	315 kg
Scott Dibert	69 kg	2000	East Coast Gold	285 kg
Kevin Dittler	83 kg	1997	Southern Arizona	292.5 kg
Salvador Dominguez	56 kg	1974		220 kg
John Downey	85 kg	2018	Catalyst Athletics	320 kg
Kendrick Farris	85 kg	2006	Shreveport/Boosier City	345 kg
Kendrick Farris	85 kg	2007	Shreveport/Boosier City	355 kg
Kendrick Farris	85 kg	2009	LSU-Shreveport	338 kg
Kendrick Farris	85 kg	2011	LSU-Shreveport	356 kg
Kendrick Farris	85 kg	2012	LSU-Shreveport	355 kg
Kendrick Farris	94 kg	2016	Unattached	377 kg
Forrest Felton	52 kg	1975		165 kg
Al Feuerbach	110 kg	1974		345 kg
Jared Fleming	94 kg	2013	East Coast Gold	337 kg
Jared Fleming	94 kg	2015	East Coast Gold	365 kg
Paul Fleschler	91 kg	1993	Sayre Park	345 kg
Paul Fleschler	91 kg	1994	Sayre Park	342.5 kg
Donovan Ford	105 kg	2015	Hassle Free	370 kg
Michael Fox	56 kg	2014	East Coast Gold	235 kg
Michael Fox	56 kg	2017	Team Juggernaut	238 kg
Lance Frye	77 kg	2005	East Coast Gold	330 kg
Lance Frye	77 kg	2008	East Coast Gold	317 kg
Andy Garcy	85 kg	2001	Wesley	320 kg
James Gargano	+110 kg	1974		345 kg
Cody Gibbs	105 kg	2007	Shreveport/Boosier City	360 kg
Cody Gibbs	105 kg	2009	LSU-Shreveport	338 kg
Gene Gilsdorf	56 kg	1986		207.5 kg
Gene Gilsdorf	56 kg	1987		202.5 kg
Gene Gilsdorf	56 kg	1990	Wesley	197.5 kg
Gene Gilsdorf	56 kg	1991	Wesley	202.5 kg
Gene Gilsdorf	56 kg	1992	Onaga, KS	207.5 kg
Shelton Gilyard	54 kg	1997	Team Florida	195.0 kg
Shelton Gilyard	56 kg	2000	Calpians	217.5 kg
Shelton Gilyard	56 kg	2001	Calpians	207.5 kg
Shelton Gilyard	56 kg	2002	Unattached	215.0 kg
Shelton Gilyard	56 kg	2003	Team Florida	210.0 kg
Shelton Gilyard	56 kg	2004	Team Florida	225.0 kg
Shelton Gilyard	56 kg	2005	Team Florida	220.0 kg
Shelton Gilyard	56 kg	2008	Team Florida Gulf Coast	197.0 kg
Dean Goad	76 kg	1993	Calpians	302.5 kg
Dean Goad	83 kg	1994	Calpians	312.5 kg
Dean Goad	83 kg	1995	Calpians	322.5 kg
Dean Goad	83 kg	1996	Calpians	312.5 kg
Dean Goad	94 kg	1999	Calpians	327.5 kg
Tom Gough	91 kg	1995	Team Southern California	350.0 kg
Tom Gough	91 kg	1996	Marin WLC	350.0 kg
Tom Gough	99 kg	1997	Team Southern California	375.0 kg
Tom Gough	105 kg	1998	Team Southern California	362.5 kg
Tom Gough	94 kg	2000	Team Montana	360.0 kg
Michael Graber	56 kg	2011	Team New Jersey	179.0 kg
TJ Greenstone	+109 kg	2019	East Coast Gold	367 kg
Phil Grippaldi	90 kg	1973	York Barbell Club	325.0 kg
Phil Grippaldi	90 kg	1974		342.5 kg
Phil Grippaldi	90 kg	1977		337.5 kg
Shane Hamman	+108 kg	1997	Team Oklahoma	362.5 kg
Shane Hamman	+105 kg	1998	Team Oklahoma	385 kg
Shane Hamman	+105 kg	1999	Unattached	402.5 kg
Shane Hamman	+105 kg	2000	Unattached	400 kg
Shane Hamman	+105 kg	2001	Unattached	415 kg
Shane Hamman	+105 kg	2002	Unattached	425 kg
Shane Hamman	+105 kg	2003	Unattached	405 kg
Shane Hamman	+105 kg	2004	Unattached	410 kg
Shane Hamman	+105 kg	2005	Unattached	387.5 kg
Jerry Hannan	+110 kg	1981		392.5 kg
John Harris	85 kg	2003	Weseley	302.5 kg
Mark Henry	+108 kg	1993	Unattached	385.0 kg
Mark Henry	+108 kg	1994	Unattached	387.5 kg
Mark Henry	+108 kg	1996	Unattached	400 kg
Tom Hirtz	82.5 kg	1974		307.5 kg
Tom Hirtz	82.5 kg	1979		317.5 kg
Dan Hogan	62 kg	2003	Team Florida	235 kg
Albert Hood	56 kg	1981		217.5 kg
Albert Hood	56 kg	1982		215 kg
Albert Hood	56 kg	1984	Health Rite	232.5 kg
Jacob Horst	62 kg	2016	Garage Strength	238 kg
Jacob Horst	67 kg	2019	Garage Strength	278 kg
Dane Hussey	60 kg	1975		242.5 kg
Dane Hussey	60 kg	1976		242.5 kg
Chad Ikei	52 kg	1991	Team Hawaii	185 kg
Chad Ikei	54 kg	1993	Team Hawaii	212.5 kg
Chad Ikei	54 kg	1994	Team Hawaii	227.5 kg
Chad Ikei	54 kg	1995	Team Hawaii	220 kg
Chad Ikei	54 kg	1996	Team Hawaii	222.5 kg
Bryan Jacob	60 kg	1990		250 kg
Bryan Jacob	60 kg	1991	Gayle Hatch	260 kg
Bryan Jacob	60 kg	1992	Norcross, GA	262.5 kg
Bryan Jacob	59 kg	1993	Gayle Hatch	265 kg
Bryan Jacob	59 kg	1994	Gayle Hatch	262.5 kg
Bryan Jacob	59 kg	1995	Coffee's Gym	265 kg
Bryan Jacob	64 kg	1997	Coffee's Gym	265 kg
Bryan Jacob	62 kg	1999	Coffee's Gym	245 kg
Bryan Jacob	62 kg	2001	Coffee's Gym	232.5 kg
Michael Jacques	67.5 kg	1983		287.5 kg
Michael Jacques	67.5 kg	1985		290 kg
Michael Jacques	67.5 kg	1988	Team South	277.5 kg
Michael Jacques	67.5 kg	1989	Team South	272.5 kg
Michael Jacques	67.5 kg	1990		265 kg
Michael Jacques	70 kg	1993	Gayle Hatch	260 kg
Michael Jacques	70 kg	1995	Coffee's Gym	267.5 kg
Chuck Jambliter	75 kg	1984	Unattached	300 kg
Lee James	90 kg	1976		355 kg
Lee James	90 kg	1978	York, PA	355 kg
Derrick Johnson	62 kg	2004	Shreveport	242.5 kg
Derrick Johnson	62 kg	2007	Lift For Life	255 kg
Derrick Johnson	62 kg	2013	Unattached	257 kg
Derrick Johnson	62 kg	2014	Texas Barbell	271 kg
Derrick Johnson	62 kg	2015	Texas Barbell	270 kg
Derrick Johnson	62 kg	2017	Texas Barbell	262 kg
Phil Jake Johnson	69 kg	2007	Midwest Weightlifting	286 kg
David Jones	75 kg	1978		295 kg
David Jones	67.5 kg	1979		270 kg
Patrick Judge	+105 kg	2008	Team Florida Gulf Coast	367 kg
Patrick Judge	+105 kg	2009	Team Florida Gulf Coast	376 kg
Patrick Judge	+105 kg	2010	Unattahed	372 kg
Mike Karchut	82.5 kg	1973	Sayre Park	315 kg
Mike Karchut	90 kg	1975		340 kg
Mike Karchut	82.5 kg	1978	Chicago, IL	337.5 kg
Mike Karchut	82.5 kg	1980		327.5 kg
Pete Kelley	99 kg	1995	Wesley	335 kg
Pete Kelley	99 kg	1996	Wesley	352.5 kg
Pete Kelley	94 kg	1998	Wesley	337.5 kg
Pete Kelley	105 kg	2001	Wesley	355 kg
Pete Kelley	105 kg	2002	Wesley	350 kg
Pete Kelley	105 kg	2003	Wesley	365 kg
Pete Kelley	105 kg	2004	Wesley	382.5 kg
Pete Kelley	105 kg	2005	Wesley	362.5 kg
Antwan Kilbert	61 kg	2019		237 kg
Wesley Kitts	105 kg	2016	California Strength	370 kg
Brey Kobashigawa	55 kg	2019		224 kg
Arn Kritsky	82.5 kg	1985		325 kg
Zachary Krych	85 kg	2010	Team Minnesota	324 kg
Dave Langon	100 kg	1990	Sports Palace	337.5 kg
Dave Langon	100 kg	1991	Sports Palace	345 kg
Alex Lee	69 kg	2016	Garage Strength	312 kg
Alex Lee	69 kg	2018		285 kg
Mario Lemon	56 kg	1998	Team Savannah	212.5 kg
Chris LeRoux	52 kg	1990		187.5 kg
Chris Leroux	62 kg	2005	Calpians	237.5 kg
Chris Leroux	56 kg	2006	Calpians	204 kg
Mark Levell	82.5 kg	1984	Sayre Park	310.0 kg
William Lewis	56 kg	1999	Team Savannah	200.0 kg
Michael Listro	75 kg	1989	Bellville	292.5 kg
Michael Listro	75 kg	1990		292.5 kg
Fred Lowe	75 kg	1973	York Barbell Club	315.0 kg
Fred Lowe	75 kg	1974		305.0 kg
Fred Lowe	75 kg	1975		297.5 kg
Fred Lowe	75 kg	1976		305.0 kg
Fred Lowe	75 kg	1981		315.0 kg
Jeff Macy	75 kg	1991	Team Florida	290.0 kg
Jeff Macy	83 kg	1993	Team Florida	300.0 kg
Michael Martin	77 kg	2001	Team Savannah	317.5 kg
Mario Martinez	+110 kg	1982		380.0 kg
Mario Martinez	+110 kg	1983		377.5 kg
Mario Martinez	+110 kg	1984		400.0 kg
Mario Martinez	+110 kg	1985		395.0 kg
Mario Martinez	+110 kg	1986	Sports Palace	372.5 kg
Mario Martinez	+110 kg	1987		392.5 kg
Mario Martinez	+110 kg	1988	Sports Palace	402.5 kg
Mario Martinez	+110 kg	1989	Sports Palace	357.5 kg
Mario Martinez	+110 kg	1991	Sports Palace	367.5 kg
Mario Martinez	+110 kg	1992	S. San Francisco, CA	382.5 kg
John McGovern	85 kg	2014	Razor's Edge Fitness	337.0 kg
Thomas McKinney	+108 kg	1995	East Coast Gold	330.0 kg
Tim McRae	56 kg	1989		207.5 kg
Tim McRae	67.5 kg	1991	Team Florida	275.0 kg
Tim McRae	64 kg	1993	Volusia County	300.0 kg
Tim McRae	70 kg	1994	Volusia County	310.0 kg
Tim McRae	70 kg	1996	Volusia County	310.0 kg
Tim McRae	76 kg	1997	Volusia County	330.0 kg
Tim McRae	85 kg	1998	Volusia County	335.0 kg
Tim McRae	85 kg	1999	Unattached	332.5 kg
Patrick Mendes	+105 kg	2011	Unattached	389.0 kg
Justin Meyer	102 kg	2019		350.0 kg
Jeff Michels	110 kg	1982		400.0 kg
Jeff Michels	110 kg	1983		407.5 kg
Jeff Michels	110 kg	1985		377.5 kg
Jeff Michels	110 kg	1988	York Barbell Club	357.5 kg
Jeff Michels	110 kg	1989	York Barbell Club	347.5 kg
Jeff Michels	+110 kg	1990	York Barbell Club	360.0 kg
Roman Mielec	60 kg	1974		232.5 kg
Brian Miyamoto	60 kg	1983		235.0 kg
Brian Miyamoto	60 kg	1985		230.0 kg
Brian Miyamoto	60 kg	1986		225.0 kg
Brian Miyamoto	60 kg	1987		232.5 kg
Roy Moore	60 kg	1973	York Barbell Club	235.0 kg
Spencer Moorman	105 kg	2013	California Strength	350.0 kg
Spencer Moorman	105 kg	2014	California Strength	346.0 kg
Robert Murphy	94 kg	2002	Team Florida	337.5 kg
Robert Murphy	94 kg	2003	Team Florida	345.0 kg
Robert Murphy	94 kg	2004	Team Florida	350.0 kg
Robert Murphy	94 kg	2005	Team Florida	355.0 kg
Jim Napier	82.5 kg	1977		322.5 kg
Ken Nashihara	52 kg	1987		187.5 kg
Thahn Nguyen	60 kg	1988	Sports Palace	222.5 kg
Thahn Nguyen	60 kg	1989	Sports Palace	237.5 kg
Thahn Nguyen	64 kg	1996	Sports Palace	272.5 kg
Jonathan North	94 kg	2011	California Strength	346 kg
Brian Okada	52 kg	1982		170.0 kg
Brian Okada	52 kg	1984	Unattached	205.0 kg
Brian Okada	56 kg	1988	Team Hawaii	195.0 kg
Brian Okada	52 kg	1992	Wailuku, HI	195.0 kg
Brian Okada	59 kg	1997	Team Hawaii	215.0 kg
Pat Omori	56 kg	1977		210.0 kg
Pat Omori	56 kg	1979		202.5 kg
John Orlando	75 kg	1985		280.0 kg
D'Angelo Osorio	105 kg	2017	Hassle Free Bbc	376.0 kg
D'Angelo Osorio	105 kg	2018	Hassle Free Bbc	358.0 kg
Vern Patao	67.5 kg	1992	Kahulu, HI	290.0 kg
Vern Patao	64 kg	1994		282.5 kg
Vern Patao	64 kg	1995	Team Hawaii	270.0 kg
Charles Pavia	69 kg	1998	Team Florida	287.5 kg
Charles Pavia	69 kg	1999	Team Florida	285.0 kg
Dave Phillips	82.5 kg	1990		330.0 kg
Anthony Pomponio	85 kg	2015	Iron Athlete Weightlifter	339.0 kg
Jacob Pudenz	109 kg	2019	California Strength	336.0 kg
Pete Rawluk	82.5 kg	1975		312.5 kg
George Giff Reed, IV	69 kg	2001	Hoosiers	252.5 kg
David Reigle	75 kg	1977		290.0 kg
David Reigle	75 kg	1979		287.5 kg
Brian Reisenauer	56 kg	2018		232.0 kg
Phil Sabatini	94 kg	2010	East Coast Gold	331.0 kg
LeGrand Sakamaki	59 kg	1996	Team Hawaii	232.5 kg
LeGrand Sakamaki	62 kg	1998	Team Hawaii	262.5 kg
LeGrand Sakamaki	62 kg	2000	Team Hawaii	265.0 kg
LeGrand Sakamaki	62 kg	2002	Team Hawaii	267.5 kg
Phil Sanderson	60 kg	1977		245.0 kg
Phil Sanderson	60 kg	1979		252.5 kg
Phil Sanderson	60 kg	1980		242.5 kg
Phil Sanderson	60 kg	1981		240.0 kg
Phil Sanderson	60 kg	1982		240.0 kg
Phil Sanderson	60 kg	1984	York Barbell Club	235.0 kg
David Santillo	75 kg	1992	Runnemede, NJ	300.0 kg
David Santillo	76 kg	1994	Calpians	280.0 kg
David Santillo	76 kg	1995	Calpians	307.5 kg
David Santillo	76 kg	1996	Calpians	305.0 kg
Gary Savage	75 kg	1986	York Barbell Club	297.5 kg
Cal Schake	67.5 kg	1980		290.0 kg
Cal Schake	67.5 kg	1981		290.0 kg
Cal Schake	75 kg	1982		315.0 kg
Cal Schake	75 kg	1983		320.0 kg
Cal Schake	67.5 kg	1986	York Barbell Club	262.5 kg
Cal Schake	67.5 kg	1987		275.0 kg
Rich Schutz	100 kg	1986		332.5 kg
Rich Schutz	110 kg	1987		345.0 kg
Rich Schutz	100 kg	1988	Sayre Park	355.0 kg
Rich Schutz	100 kg	1989	Sayre Park	347.5 kg
Rich Schutz	110 kg	1990		365.0 kg
Rich Schutz	100 kg	1991	Sayre Park	360.0 kg
Rich Schutz	110 kg	1992	Mt. Prospect, IL	370.0 kg
Rich Schutz	108 kg	1993	Sayre Park	350.0 kg
Rich Schutz	99 kg	1994	Sayre Park	342.5 kg
Kurt Setterberg	100 kg	1978	Warren, OH	345.0 kg
Kurt Setterberg	100 kg	1979		350.0 kg
Les Sewall	52 kg	1980		182.5 kg
Donald Shankle	105 kg	2006	Wichita Falls	353.0 kg
Donald Shankle	105 kg	2008	Wichita Falls	346.0 kg
Donald Shankle	105 kg	2011	California Strength	359.0 kg
Donald Shankle	105 kg	2012	California Strength	370.0 kg
Jerome Smith	73 kg	2019		292 kg
Mike Soha	85 kg	2009	Unattached	271.0 kg
John Stang	69 kg	2017	Mash Mafia Weightlifting	276.0 kg
Jacob Stefan	+110 kg	1973	LA YMCA	352.5 kg
Tom Stock	+110 kg	1978	Belleville, IL	377.5 kg
Tom Stock	+110 kg	1979		377.5 kg
Tom Stock	+110 kg	1980		392.5 kg
Cameron Swart	+105 kg	2012	Team Houston	374.0 kg
Dwight Tamanaha	56 kg	1973	LA YMCA	205.0 kg
James Tatum	77 kg	2014	Muscle Driver USA	324.0 kg
James Tatum	85 kg	2016	Unattached	341.0 kg
James Tatum	85 kg	2017	East Coast Gold W/L Team	335.0 kg
Matt Terry	94 kg	2001	Bengal	335.0 kg
Stewart Thornbugh	56 kg	1978	Charleston, IL	220.0 kg
Andy Tysz	105 kg	2000	Phat Elvis	345.0 kg
Innocent Ukpong	85 kg	2008	Team Houston	318.0 kg
Roberto Tony Urrutia	75 kg	1987		300.0 kg
Roberto Tony Urrutia	75 kg	1988	York Barbell Club	330.0 kg
Roberto Tony Urrutia	82.5 kg	1989	York	315.0 kg
Roberto Tony Urrutia	82.5 kg	1991	Titan	325.0 kg
Roberto Tony Urrutia	82.5 kg	1992	Hollywood, FL	330.0 kg
Norik Vardanian	94 kg	2008	Unattached	355.0 kg
Chad Vaughn	77 kg	2002	Spoon BBC	315.0 kg
Chad Vaughn	77 kg	2003	Spoon BBC	325.0 kg
Chad Vaughn	77 kg	2004	Spoon BBC	332.5 kg
Chad Vaughn	85 kg	2005	Spoon BBC	335.0 kg
Chad Vaughn	77 kg	2006	Spoon BBC	322.0 kg
Chad Vaughn	77 kg	2010	Spoon BBC	325.0 kg
Chad Vaughn	77 kg	2011	Spoon BBC	335.0 kg
Chad Vaughn	77 kg	2012	Spoon BBC	325.0 kg
Chad Vaughn	77 kg	2013	Spoon BBC	303.0 kg
Sam Walker	+110 kg	1977		352.5 kg
Donny Warner	52 kg	1973	York Barbell Club	177.5 kg
Donny Warner	60 kg	1978	York, PA	247.5 kg
Robert Wentlejewski	108 kg	1996	Northern Arizona	322.5 kg
Curt White	52 kg	1977		187.5 kg
Curt White	82.5 kg	1982		322.5 kg
Curt White	82.5 kg	1983		355.0 kg
Curt White	82.5 kg	1986	York Barbell Club	337.5 kg
Curt White	90 kg	1985		350.0 kg
Curt White	82.5 kg	1988	York Barbell Club	322.5 kg
Brad Wickersham	56 kg	1985		197.5 kg
Joel Widdel	52 kg	1974		195.0 kg
Joel Widdel	52 kg	1976		175.0 kg
Joel Widdel	56 kg	1980		210.0 kg
Bruce Wilhelm	+110 kg	1975		347.5 kg
Bruce Wilhelm	+110 kg	1976		385.0 kg
Caine Wilkes	+105 kg	2013	Unattached	392.0 kg
Caine Wilkes	+105 kg	2014	Unattached	400.0 kg
Caine Wilkes	+105 kg	2015	Muscle Driver USA	416.0 kg
Caine Wilkes	+105 kg	2016	Mash Mafia Weightlifting	404.0 kg
Caine Wilkes	+105 kg	2017	Little League Weightlifting	387.0 kg
Corey Wilkes	85 kg	2000	Unattached	340.0 kg
Caleb Williams	69 kg	2011	Coffee's Gym	283.0 kg
Caleb Williams	69 kg	2012	Peak Performance of GA	294.0 kg
Caleb Williams	69 kg	2013	Peak Performance of GA	291.0 kg
Caleb Williams	69 kg	2014	Peak Performance of GA	304.0 kg
Ian Wilson	94 kg	2012	Hassle Free Barbell	344.0 kg
Kevin Winter	90 kg	1981		342.5 kg
Kevin Winter	90 kg	1982		340.0 kg
Kevin Winter	90 kg	1984	Sports Palace	347.5 kg
Keiser Witte	+105 kg	2018		377.0 kg
Jeff Wittmer	94 kg	2006	Wesley	335.0 kg
Jeff Wittmer	94 kg	2007	Wesley	345.0 kg
Steve Womble	52 kg	1986		162.5 kg
Steve Womble	52 kg	1988	Olympic Health Club	172.5 kg
Steve Womble	52 kg	1989	Olympic Health Club	160.0 kg
John Yamauchi	56 kg	1975		212.5 kg
John Yamauchi	56 kg	1976		217.5 kg
Kyle Yamauchi	62 kg	2010	Team Hawaii	238.0 kg
Kyle Yamauchi	62 kg	2011	Team Hawaii	237.0 kg
Dirk Yasko	52 kg	1983		172.5 kg

== National Champions Press, Snatch, and Clean & Jerk (1928-1972) ==
As of 14 May 2019

Athlete	Weight class	Year	Hometown/Team	Total
Paul Anderson	Heavyweight	1955	York Barbell Club	519 kg
Paul Anderson	Heavyweight	1956	Tocoa, GA	533 kg
Dave Ashman	Heavyweight	1957	York Barbell Club	433 kg
Dave Ashman	Heavyweight	1958	York Barbell Club	454 kg
Dave Ashman	Heavyweight	1959	York Barbell Club	472 kg
Richard Bachtell	60 kg	1929	Arcade AC. Hagerstown, MD	852 1/2 Lbs
Richard Bachtell	60 kg	1930	Association of Bar Bell Men	847 Lbs
Richard Bachtell	60 kg	1931	Arcade AC	852 1/2 Lbs
Richard Bachtell	60 kg	1932	York Oil Burner AC, PA	570 Lbs
Richard Bachtell	60 kg	1934	York Oil Burner AC, PA	896 1/2 Lbs
Richard Bachtell	60 kg	1935	York Oil Burner AC, PA	935 Lbs
Richard Bachtell	60 kg	1937	York Oil Burner AC, PA	635 Lbs
Richard Bachtell	60 kg	1943	York Barbell Club	630 Lbs
Fernando Báez	56 kg	1968		740 Lbs
Fernando Báez	56 kg	1969	Puerto Rico	745 Lbs
Fernando Báez	60 kg	1970		750 Lbs
Bob Bartholomew	90 kg	1966	York Barbell Club	985 Lbs
Bob Bednarski	110 kg	1967	York Barbell Club	1175 Lbs
Bob Bednarski	110 kg	1968	York Barbell Club	1280 Lbs
Bob Bednarski	110 kg	1969	York Barbell Club	1210 Lbs
Bob Bednarski	110 kg	1970	York Barbell Club	1185 Lbs
Jim Benjamin	67.5 kg	1970		860 Lbs
Jim Benjamin	67.5 kg	1971		390.0 kg
Isaac Berger	60 kg	1955	York Barbell Club	705 Lbs
Isaac Berger	60 kg	1956	York Barbell Club	720 Lbs
Isaac Berger	60 kg	1957	York Barbell Club	760 Lbs
Isaac Berger	60 kg	1958	York Barbell Club	800 Lbs
Isaac Berger	60 kg	1959	York Barbell Club	740 Lbs
Isaac Berger	60 kg	1960	York Barbell Club	810 Lbs
Isaac Berger	60 kg	1961	York Barbell Club	790 Lbs
Isaac Berger	60 kg	1964	York Barbell Club	795 Lbs
Al Bevan	82.5 kg	1928	Los Angeles AC	605 Lbs
Jim Bradford	Heavyweight	1960	Ashford A.C.	1085 Lbs
Jim Bradford	Heavyweight	1961	Ashford A.C.	1070 Lbs
Homer Brannum	67.5 kg	1965	Dallas, TX	820 Lbs
Homer Brannum	67.5 kg	1967	Dallas, TX	835 Lbs
Eugene Casasola	52 kg	1970	York Barbell Club	605 Lbs
Dan Cantore	67.5 kg	1972		422.5 kg
Frank Capsouras	90 kg	1969	York Barbell Club	1080 Lbs
Frank Capsouras	110 kg	1972		525.0 kg
Eugene Casasola	52 kg	1970	York Barbell Club	605 Lbs
Elwood Cauffman	58 kg	1939	Central YMCA, Rochester, NY	560 Lbs
Gary Cleveland	82.5 kg	1964		955 Lbs
Gary Cleveland	82.5 kg	1965		985 Lbs
Wesley Cochrane	56 kg	1941	Maspeth WLC, LI	616 1/2 Lbs
Fred Curry	60 kg	1944	Santa Monica, CA	660 Lbs
H. G. Curtis	Heavyweight	1945	U. S. Navy	855 Lbs
John Davis	82.5 kg	1939	York Barbell Club	815 Lbs
John Davis	82.5 kg	1940	York Barbell Club	855 Lbs
John Davis	Heavyweight	1941	York Barbell Club	1009 3/4 Lbs
John Davis	Heavyweight	1942	York Barbell Club	905 Lbs
John Davis	Heavyweight	1943	York Barbell Club	940 Lbs
John Davis	Heavyweight	1946	Brooklyn, NY	918 Lbs
John Davis	Heavyweight	1947	York, PA	900 Lbs
John Davis	Heavyweight	1948	York, PA	1025 Lbs
John Davis	Heavyweight	1950	York, PA	1010 Lbs
John Davis	Heavyweight	1951	York, PA	1062 Lbs
John Davis	Heavyweight	1952	York, PA	1002 Lbs
John Davis	Heavyweight	1953	York, PA	990 Lbs
Gary Deal	110 kg	1971		525.0 kg
Joe De Pietro	56 kg	1942	Unattached, Paterson, NJ	256 kg
Joe De Pietro	56 kg	1943	Unattached, Paterson, NJ	265 kg
Joe De Pietro	60 kg	1945	Circle Pool Club	279 kg
Joe De Pietro	56 kg	1946	WLC, Southern California	293 kg
Joe De Pietro	56 kg	1947	Yacos, Detroit	279 kg
Joe De Pietro	56 kg	1948	Paterson, NJ	306 kg
Joe De Pietro	56 kg	1949	Paterson, NJ	281 kg
Joe De Pietro	56 kg	1950	Paterson, NJ	288 kg
Joe De Pietro	56 kg	1951	Paterson, NJ	290 kg
Salvador Dominguez	56 kg	1970	York Barbell Club	650 Lbs
Salvador Dominguez	56 kg	1971		302.5 kg
Salvador Dominguez	56 kg	1972		305.0 kg
Bert Elliott	75 kg	1954	Los Angeles, CA	765 Lbs
Clyde Emerick	82.5 kg	1952	U.S. Army	865 Lbs
Clyde Emerick	90 kg	1956	York Barbell Club	955 Lbs
Clyde Emerick	90 kg	1957	York Barbell Club	910 Lbs
Clyde Emerick	90 kg	1959	York Barbell Club	945 Lbs
Adolph Faas	75 kg	1929	Cooper AC, Brooklyn, NY	902 Lbs
Angel Faminglietta	56 kg	1957	Panama	640 Lbs
Joseph Fiorito	53.5 kg	1932	Norristown, PA	485 Lbs
Joseph Fiorito	53.5 kg	1933	York Oil Burner AC, PA	496 1/2 Lbs
Joseph Fiorito	53.5 kg	1935	York Oil Burner AC, PA	718 Lbs
Joseph Fiorito	53.5 kg	1936	York Oil Burner AC, PA	533 1/2 Lbs
Joseph Fiorito	56 kg	1940	York Barbell Club	550 Lbs
John Fritshe	51 kg	1936	Sandow AC, Philadelphia, PA	456 1/2 Lbs
Tony Garcy	67.5 kg	1960	York Barbell Club	780 Lbs
Tony Garcy	67.5 kg	1962	York Barbell Club	800 Lbs
Tony Garcy	67.5 kg	1963	York Barbell Club	805 Lbs
Tony Garcy	75 kg	1965	Chicago, IL	880 Lbs
Tony Garcy	75 kg	1966	York Barbell Club	940 Lbs
A. Gaukler	58 kg	1929	German American AC, NY	665 1/2 Lbs
Jim George	82.5 kg	1956	Akron OH	875 Lbs
Jim George	82.5 kg	1958	Akron OH	880 Lbs
Jim George	82.5 kg	1959	A.C.M.W.L.	900 Lbs
Jim George	82.5 kg	1960	A.C.M.W.L.	915 Lbs
Pete George	67.5 kg	1946	American College of Modern WL	716 Lbs
Pete George	75 kg	1949	Akron, OH	830 Lbs
Pete George	75 kg	1950	Akron, OH	835 Lbs
Pete George	75 kg	1951	Akron, OH	860 Lbs
Pete George	75 kg	1952	Akron, OH	800 Lbs
Pete George	75 kg	1957	US Army	885 Lbs
Richard Giller	75 kg	1955	Akron, OH	800 Lbs
Paul Goldberg	67.5 kg	1959	York Barbell Club	780 Lbs
Paul Goldberg	67.5 kg	1961	York Barbell Club	745 Lbs
William L. Good	82.5 kg	1930	Unattached, Reamstown, PA	1017 1/2 Lbs
William L. Good	82.5 kg	1931	Unattached, Reamstown, PA	1056 Lbs
William L. Good	82.5 kg	1932	Unattached, Reamstown, PA	715 Lbs
William L. Good	82.5 kg	1933	York Oil Burner AC	733 Lbs
William L. Good	Heavyweight	1934	York Oil Burner AC, PA	1210 Lbs
William L. Good	Heavyweight	1935	York Oil Burner AC, PA	1205 Lbs
William L. Good	82.5 kg	1937	Unattached, Reamstown, PA	800 Lbs
Richard Greenawalt	60 kg	1950	Columbus, OH	367.0 kg
John Grimek	Heavyweight	1936	Shore AC, Asbury Park, NJ	786 1/2 Lbs
Phil Grippaldi	90 kg	1967	York Barbell Club	1035 Lbs
Phil Grippaldi	90 kg	1968	York Barbell Club	1055 Lbs
Phil Grippaldi	90 kg	1970	Keasby Eagles	1090 Lbs
Gary Gubner	Heavyweight	1966	Grand St. Boys' Club	1170 Lbs
Gary Hanson	56 kg	1964	New York, NY	700 Lbs
Gary Hanson	56 kg	1965	New York, NY	665 Lbs
Gary Hanson	56 kg	1967	New York, NY	690 Lbs
Gary Hanson	60 kg	1969	York Barbell Club	770 Lbs
Ed Heffernan	118 Lb	1937	Toronto-York WLC, Canada	535 Lbs
Sid Henry	Heavyweight	1963	Dallas, TX	1125 Lbs
Enrique Hernandez	60 kg	1971	Guest	347.5 kg
Rick Holbrook	90 kg	1971		497.5 kg
Rick Holbrook	90 kg	1972		512.5 kg
George Horn	67.5 kg	1931	German American AC, NY	935 Lbs
Jack Hughes	56 kg	1953	Akron, OH	515 Lbs
A. Hutchison	51 kg	1937	Oliphant Physical Academy Toronto	515 Lbs
Ichinoseki	56 kg	1963	Japan	700 Lbs
Walter Imahara	60 kg	1962	US Army	720 Lbs
Walter Imahara	60 kg	1963	US Army	720 Lbs
Walter Imahara	60 kg	1965	New Orleans AC	790 Lbs
Walter Imahara	60 kg	1966	New Orleans AC	765 Lbs
Walter Imahara	60 kg	1967	New Orleans AC	775 Lbs
Walter Imahara	60 kg	1968	New Orleans AC	795 Lbs
Emerick Ishikawa	56 kg	1944	York, PA	630 Lbs
Emerick Ishikawa	123 Lb/56 kg	1945	York, PA	635 Lbs
Emerick Ishikawa	132 Lb/60 kg	1946	Yacos Gym, Detroit	641 Lbs
Emerick Ishikawa	132 Lb/60 kg	1947	York, PA	670 Lbs
Mike Karchut	181 Lb/82.5 kg	1969	Duncan YMCA	1035 Lbs
Mike Karchut	181 Lb/82.5 kg	1970	Sayre Park	1055 Lbs
Mike Karchut	181 Lb/82.5 kg	1971		457.5 kg
Mike Karchut	181 Lb/82.5 kg	1972		472.5 kg
Frank Kay	181 Lb/82.5 kg	1941	Chicago WLC, Chicago, IL	850 Lbs
Frank Kay	181 Lb/82.5 kg	1942	Chicago WLC, Chicago, IL	860 Lbs
Frank Kay	181 Lb/82.5 kg	1946	N.W.W.L.C.	836 Lbs
Russ Knipp	165 Lb/75 kg	1967	Pittsburgh, PA	955 Lbs
Russ Knipp	165 Lb/75 kg	1968	Pittsburgh, PA	955 Lbs
Russ Knipp	165 Lb/75 kg	1971		457.5 kg
Robert Knodle	118 Lb	1929	Arcade AC, Hagerstown, MD	682 Lbs
Robert Knodle	118 Lb	1930	Arcade AC, Hagerstown, MD	715 Lbs
Robert Knodle	118 Lb	1931	Arcade AC, Hagerstown, MD	715 Lbs
Robert Knodle	112 Lb	1934	Hagerstown, MD	693 Lbs.
Tommy Kono	148 Lb/67.5 kg	1952	US Army	709 Lbs
Tommy Kono	165 Lb/75 kg	1953	Oakland, CA	915 Lbs
Tommy Kono	181 Lb/82.5 kg	1954	Oakland, CA	930 Lbs
Tommy Kono	181 Lb/82.5 kg	1955	Honolulu	940 Lbs
Tommy Kono	181 Lb/82.5 kg	1957	Honolulu	970 Lbs
Tommy Kono	165 Lb/75 kg	1958	Honolulu	890 Lbs
Tommy Kono	165 Lb/75 kg	1959	York AC Hawaii	905 Lbs
Tommy Kono	165 Lb/75 kg	1960	York AC Hawaii	865 Lbs
Tommy Kono	181 Lb/82.5 kg	1961	York AC Hawaii	980 Lbs
Tommy Kono	181 Lb/82.5 kg	1962	York AC Hawaii	945 Lbs
Tommy Kono	181 Lb/82.5 kg	1963	York AC Hawaii	970 Lbs
Stanley Kratkowski	165 Lb/75 kg	1932	Detroit, MI	680 Lbs
Stanley Kratkowski	165 Lb/75 kg	1934	German American AC, Detroit	1039 1/2 Lbs
Stanley Kratkowski	165 Lb/75 kg	1935	Michigan AC, Detroit	1095 Lbs
Stanley Kratkowski	165 Lb/75 kg	1936	Michigan Alkali	748 Lbs
Stanley Kratkowski	181 Lb/82.5 kg	1938	Wyandotte, MI	805 Lbs
Dick Krell	123 Lb/56 kg	1962	Torio H.C.	670 Lbs
Yaz Kuzuhara	132 Lb/60 kg	1954	York Barbell Club	685 Lbs
Lucian LaPlante	112 Lb	1932	West End AC, Gardner, MA	470 Lbs.
Lucian LaPlante	112 Lb	1933	West End AC, Gardner, MA	485 1/2 Lbs.
B. Leardi	118 Lb	1938	Paterson, NJ	520 Lbs
B. Leardi	118 Lb	1939	Paterson YMCA, NJ	525 Lbs
A. Firpo Lemma	112 Lb	1938	Paterson, NJ	561 Lbs
A. Firpo Lemma	112 Lb	1939	Paterson, NJ (Bates WLC)	530 Lbs
J. Arthur Levan	128 Lb	1930	Association of Bar Bell Men	819 1/2 Lbs
J. Arthur Levan	126 Lb	1931	Reading, PA	852 1/2 Lbs
J. Arthur Levan	126 Lb	1932	Reading, PA	540 Lbs
J. Arthur Levan	126 Lb	1933	York Oil Burner AC, PA	568 Lbs
J. Arthur Levan	126 Lb	1934	York Oil Burner AC, PA	830 Lbs
J. Arthur Levan	126 Lb	1935	York Oil Burner AC, PA	841 Lbs
J. Arthur Levan	126 Lb	1936	York Oil Burner AC, PA	588 1/2 Lbs
Fred Lowe	165 Lb/75 kg	1969	York Barbell Club	950 Lbs
Fred Lowe	165 Lb/75 kg	1970	York Barbell Club	960 Lbs
Fred Lowe	165 Lb/75 kg	1972		450.0 kg
William Lowrance	132 Lb/60 kg	1948	Leo Stern's Gym, CA	675 Lbs
John Mallo	Heavyweight	1933	Lion Tailors, Akron, OH	760 1/2 Lbs
Albert Manger	181 Lb/82.5 kg	1929	Baltimore, Md.	957 Lbs
Albert Manger	Heavyweight	1930	Baltimore YMCA, MD	1001 Lbs
Albert Manger	Heavyweight	1932	Baltimore, MD	704 Lbs
James Manning	165 Lb/75 kg	1943	Los Angeles YMCA, LA	750 Lbs
Steve Mansour	148 Lb/67.5 kg	1968		820 Lbs
Steve Mansour	148 Lb/67.5 kg	1969	Michigan	860 Lbs
Bill March	198 Lb/90 kg	1961	York Barbell Club	950 Lbs
Bill March	198 Lb/90 kg	1962	York Barbell Club	975 Lbs
Bill March	198 Lb/90 kg	1963	York Barbell Club	1000 Lbs
Bill March	198 Lb/90 kg	1964	York Barbell Club	1010 Lbs
Bill March	198 Lb/90 kg	1965	York Barbell Club	1020 Lbs
James Massai Bu	148 Lb/67.5 kg	1964	New York, NY	775 Lbs
David Mayor	Heavyweight	1937	York Oil Burner AC, PA	835 Lbs
B. McDowell	165 Lb/75 kg	1928	Willoughby's Gym	570 Lbs
John H. Miller	181 Lb/82.5 kg	1936	Unattached	761 Lbs
Joe Mills	132 Lb/60 kg	1942	Notre Dame AC, Woonsocket, RI	635 Lbs
Larry Mintz	148 Lb/67.5 kg	1966	Electchester AA	805 Lbs
Robert M. Mitchell	148 Lb/67.5 kg	1934	York Oil Burner AC, PA	990 Lbs
Miyake	132 Lb/60 kg	1963	Japan	800 Lbs
Dave Moyer	123 Lb/56 kg	1963	Redding, PA	640 Lbs
Dave Moyer	114 Lb/52 kg	1971		265.0 kg
Mike Mungioli	126 Lb	1937	Titan WLC, Maspeth, LI	585 Lbs
Mike Mungioli	126 Lb	1938	Titan WLC, Maspeth, LI	600 Lbs
Joe Murry	242 Lb/110 kg	1968		1035 Lbs
Ohuchi	165 Lb/75 kg	1963	Japan	895 Lbs
K. Onuma	148 Lb/67.5 kg	1958	Japan	795 Lbs
Mitz Oshima	132 Lb/60 kg	1953	Oakland, CA	680 Lbs
Hitoshi Ouchi	165 Lb/75 kg	1963	Japan	895 Lbs
Ken Patera	Super Heavyweight	1969	Multnomah AC	1195 Lbs
Ken Patera	Super Heavyweight	1970	Multnomah AC	1285 Lbs
Ken Patera	Super Heavyweight	1971		592.5 kg
Ken Patera	Super Heavyweight	1972		607.5 kg
Joe Pitman	148 Lb/67.5 kg	1947	Chambersberg, PA	705 Lbs
Joe Pitman	148 Lb/67.5 kg	1948	Chambersburg, PA	730 Lbs
Joe Pitman	148 Lb/67.5 kg	1949	Chambersburg, PA	735 Lbs
Joe Pitman	148 Lb/67.5 kg	1950	Chambersburg, PA	765 Lbs
Joe Pitman	148 Lb/67.5 kg	1951	Chambersburg, PA	775 Lbs
Joe Pitman	148 Lb/67.5 kg	1953	York Barbell Club	745 Lbs
Joe Pitman	148 Lb/67.5 kg	1954	York Barbell Club	755 Lbs
Joe Pitman	148 Lb/67.5 kg	1955	York Barbell Club	765 Lbs
Joe Pitman	148 Lb/67.5 kg	1956	York Barbell Club	785 Lbs
Joe Pitman	148 Lb/67.5 kg	1957	York Barbell Club	770 Lbs
Joe Puleo	165 Lb/75 kg	1962	York Barbell Club	875 Lbs
Joe Puleo	165 Lb/75 kg	1963	York Barbell Club	860 Lbs
Joe Puleo	165 Lb/75 kg	1964	York Barbell Club	805 Lbs
Joe Puleo	181 Lb/82.5 kg	1966	York Barbell Club	935 Lbs
Joe Puleo	181 Lb/82.5 kg	1967	York Barbell Club	955 Lbs
Joe Puleo	181 Lb/82.5 kg	1968	York Barbell Club	1025 Lbs
John Pulskamp	198 Lb/90 kg	1960	Columbus, A.C.	990 Lbs
Gino Quilici	181 Lb/82.5 kg	1934	Multnomah AC	1012 Lbs
Max Rohrer	148 Lb/67.5 kg	1929	Cooper AC, Brooklyn, NY	891 Lbs
Max Rohrer	148 Lb/67.5 kg	1930	Cooper AC, Brooklyn, NY	935 Lbs
William Rohrer	Heavyweight	1929	Cooper AC, Brooklyn, NY	1045 Lbs
William Rohrer	Heavyweight	1931	Cooper AC, Brooklyn, NY	784 1/2 Lbs
David Rothman	112 Lb	1935	German American AC, NY	638 Lbs
Phil Sanderson	132 Lb/60 kg	1972		337.5 kg
Norbert Schemansky	Heavyweight	1949	N.Y.M.C.A., Detroit, MI	885 Lbs
Norbert Schemansky	198 Lb/90 kg	1951	N.Y.M.C.A., Detroit, MI	915 Lbs
Norbert Schemansky	198 Lb/90 kg	1952	Detroit, MI	887 Lbs
Norbert Schemansky	198 Lb/90 kg	1953	Detroit, MI	900 Lbs
Norbert Schemansky	Heavyweight	1954	Detroit, MI	1050 Lbs
Norbert Schemansky	225 Lb	1957	Detroit, MI	990 Lbs
Norbert Schemansky	Heavyweight	1962	York Barbell Club	1140 Lbs
Norbert Schemansky	Heavyweight	1964	York Barbell Club	1160 Lbs
Norbert Schemansky	Heavyweight	1965	York Barbell Club	1155 Lbs
Frank Schofro	Heavyweight	1944	Rollo, MO	850 Lbs
Fred Schutz	198 Lb/90 kg	1958	York Barbell Club	925 Lbs
Lionel Shepherd	123 Lb/56 kg	1966	Wilmington WLC	630 Lbs
Dave Sheppard	198 Lb/90 kg	1954	York Barbell Club	975 Lbs
Dave Sheppard	198 Lb/90 kg	1955	York Barbell Club	965 Lbs
Dave Sheppard	225 Lb	1958	York Barbell Club	960 Lbs
Frank Spellman	165 Lb/75 kg	1946	York, PA	831 Lbs
Frank Spellman	165 Lb/75 kg	1948	York, PA	855 Lbs
Frank Spellman	165 Lb/75 kg	1961	Westside, JC	800 Lbs
Stan Stanczyk	165 Lb/75 kg	1947	York, PA	825 Lbs
Stan Stanczyk	181 Lb/82.5 kg	1948	York, PA	880 Lbs
Stan Stanczyk	181 Lb/82.5 kg	1949	York, PA	915 Lbs
Stan Stanczyk	181 Lb/82.5 kg	1950	York, PA	910 Lbs
Stan Stanczyk	181 Lb/82.5 kg	1951	York, PA	885 Lbs
Stan Stanczyk	181 Lb/82.5 kg	1953	York, PA	915 Lbs
Steve Stanko	Heavyweight	1938	Perth Amboy, NJ	850 Lbs
Steve Stanko	Heavyweight	1939	York Barbell Club	895 Lbs
Steve Stanko	Heavyweight	1940	York Barbell Club	950 1/2 Lbs
Arnie Sundberg	148 Lb/67.5 kg	1928	Multnomah AC	570 Lbs
Arnie Sundberg	165 Lb/75 kg	1930	Multnomah AC	968 Lbs
Arnie Sundberg	165 Lb/75 kg	1931	Multnomah AC	940 1/2 Lbs
Arnie Sundberg	148 Lb/67.5 kg	1932	Multnomah AC	632 Lbs
Anthony Terlazzo	132 Lb/60 kg	1932	New York City	570 Lbs
Anthony Terlazzo	148 Lb/67.5 kg	1933	York Oil Burner AC, PA	667 Lbs
Anthony Terlazzo	148 Lb/67.5 kg	1935	York Oil Burner AC, PA	1006 1/2 Lbs
Anthony Terlazzo	132 Lb/60 kg	1936	York Oil Burner AC, PA	693 Lbs
Anthony Terlazzo	148 Lb/67.5 kg	1937	York Oil Burner AC, PA	780 Lbs
Anthony Terlazzo	148 Lb/67.5 kg	1938	York Oil Burner AC, PA	765 Lbs
Anthony Terlazzo	148 Lb/67.5 kg	1939	York Barbell Club	805 Lbs
Anthony Terlazzo	148 Lb/67.5 kg	1940	York Barbell Club	770 Lbs
Anthony Terlazzo	148 Lb/67.5 kg	1941	York Barbell Club	800 Lbs
Anthony Terlazzo	148 Lb/67.5 kg	1942	York Barbell Club	760 Lbs
Anthony Terlazzo	148 Lb/67.5 kg	1943	York Barbell Club	800 Lbs
Anthony Terlazzo	148 Lb/67.5 kg	1944	York, PA	800 Lbs
Anthony Terlazzo	148 Lb/67.5 kg	1945	York, PA	760 Lbs
John Terpak	148 Lb/67.5 kg	1936	York Oil Burner AC, PA	737 Lbs
John Terpak	165 Lb/75 kg	1937	York Oil Burner AC, PA	805 Lbs
John Terpak	165 Lb/75 kg	1938	York Oil Burner AC, PA	785 Lbs
John Terpak	165 Lb/75 kg	1939	York Barbell Club	800 Lbs
John Terpak	165 Lb/75 kg	1940	York Barbell Club	800 Lbs
John Terpak	165 Lb/75 kg	1941	York Barbell Club	815 Lbs
John Terpak	165 Lb/75 kg	1942	York Barbell Club	800 Lbs
John Terpak	181 Lb/82.5 kg	1943	York, PA	800 Lbs
John Terpak	165 Lb/75 kg	1944	York, PA	800 Lbs
John Terpak	165 Lb/75 kg	1945	York, PA	775 Lbs
John Terpak	181 Lb/82.5 kg	1947	York, PA	840 Lbs
John Terry	132 Lb/60 kg	1938	New York, NY	640 Lbs
John Terry	132 Lb/60 kg	1939	York Barbell Club	660 Lbs
John Terry	132 Lb/60 kg	1940	York Barbell Club	665 Lbs
John Terry	132 Lb/60 kg	1941	York Barbell Club	665 Lbs
Richard Tom	123 Lb/56 kg	1952	Hawaii	628 Lbs
Richard Tomita	132 Lb/60 kg	1949	Honolulu, T. H.	665 Lbs
Richard Tomita	132 Lb/60 kg	1952	Honolulu, T. H.	661 Lbs
Tom Tyler	Heavyweight	1928	Los Angeles AC	760 Lbs
Ralph Vieria	118 Lb	1934	Red Wing AC, New Bedford, MA	731 1/2 Lbs
Chuck Vinci	123 Lb/56 kg	1954	York Barbell Club	620 Lbs
Chuck Vinci	123 Lb/56 kg	1955	York Barbell Club	690 Lbs
Chuck Vinci	123 Lb/56 kg	1956	York Barbell Club	690 Lbs
Chuck Vinci	123 Lb/56 kg	1958	York Barbell Club	715 Lbs
Chuck Vinci	123 Lb/56 kg	1959	York Barbell Club	700 Lbs
Chuck Vinci	123 Lb/56 kg	1960	York Barbell Club	700 Lbs
Chuck Vinci	123 Lb/56 kg	1961	York Barbell Club	740 Lbs
H. Vinkin	181 Lb/82.5 kg	1945	U. S. Navy	770 Lbs
Clement Warner	165 Lb/75 kg	1956	L.I. WLC	835 Lbs
S. Weisch	181 Lb/82.5 kg	1935	Prudential Inc. Co. A.A., Newark	1023 1/2 Lbs
John Yamauchi	114 Lb/52 kg	1972		275.0 kg
George Yoshioka	132 Lb/60 kg	1951	Honolulu, T. H.	650 Lbs
Walter Zagurski	165 Lb/75 kg	1933	York Oil Burner AC, PA	694 1/2 Lbs

== Multiple champions who have won at least three titles ==
As of 30 June 2025

#	Name
13	Anthony Terlazzo
12	Johnny Davis
11	Tommy Kono, Johnny Terpak
10	Mario Martinez, Joe Pitman
9	Joe DePietro, Shane Hamman, Bryan Jacob, Norbert Schemansky, Rich Schutz, Chad Vaughn
8	Richard Bachtell, Isaac Berger, Shelton Gilyard, Mike Karchut, Pete Kelley, Fred Lowe, Tim McRae
7	Henry Brower, Travis Cooper, William Good, Michael Jacques, Arthur Levan, Phil Sanderson, Chuck Vinci
6	Wes Barnett, Mark Cameron, Oscar Chaplin, III, Ken Clark, Kendrick Farris, Pete George, Phil Grippaldi, Walter Imahara, Derrick Johnson, Jeff Michels, Joe Puleo, Cal Schake, Stan Stanczyk, Curt White, Caine Wilkes
5	Bob Bednarski, Dan Cantore, Joseph Fiorito, Tony Garcy, Gene Gilsdorf, Dean Goad, Tommy Gough, Chad Ikei, Stanley Kratkowski, Bill March, Brian Okada, Roberto Tony Urrutia
4	Darren Barnes, Salvador Dominguez, Clyde Emerick, Jim George, Gary Hanson, Emerick Ishikawa, Robert Knodle, Brian Miyamoto, Hampton Morris, Robert Murphy, Ken Patera, LeGrand Sakamaki, David Santillo, Donald Shankle, Arnis Sundberg, John Terry, Caleb Williams, Jacob Horst
3	Don Abrahamson, Aaron Adams, Dave Ashman, Fernando Baez, Jim Benjamin, Brett Brian, Casey Burgener, Derrick Crass, Clarence Cummings, Nathan Damron, Ryan Grimsland, Mark Henry, Albert Hood, Patrick Judge, Frank Kay, Wes Kitts, Russ Knipp, Chris LeRoux, Albert Manger, Thahn Nguyen, Vern Patao, Dave Sheppard, Frank Spellman, Steve Stanko, Tom Stock, James Tatum, Joel Widdel, Kevin Winter, Keiser Witte, Steve Womble, John Yamauchi

== See also ==
- List of United States women's national weightlifting champions
