= List of United States national weightlifting champions =

This list has been divided in

- List of United States men's national weightlifting champions
- List of United States women's national weightlifting champions
