= 1937 World Weightlifting Championships =

International weightlifting competition

19 Men's World Championships
- Host city: Paris, France
- Dates: September 10–12, 1937

The 1937 Men's World Weightlifting Championships were held in Paris, France from September 10 to September 12, 1937. There were 50 men in action from 10 nations.

== Medal summary ==
| Event | Gold | | Silver | | Bronze | |
|---|---|---|---|---|---|---|
| Featherweight; 60 kg | Georg Liebsch; Germany | 297.5 kg | Anton Richter; Austria | 287.5 kg | Max Walter; Germany | 287.5 kg |
| Lightweight; 67.5 kg | Tony Terlazzo; United States | 357.5 kg | Robert Fein; Austria | 355.0 kg | Karl Jansen; Germany | 330.0 kg |
| Middleweight; 75 kg | John Terpak; United States | 357.5 kg | Adolf Wagner; Germany | 340.0 kg | Hans Valla; Austria | 340.0 kg |
| Light heavyweight 82.5 kg | Fritz Haller; Austria | 375.0 kg | Louis Hostin; France | 372.5 kg | Anton Gietl; Germany | 365.0 kg |
| Heavyweight +82.5 kg | Josef Manger; Germany | 420.0 kg | Václav Pšenička; Czechoslovakia | 405.0 kg | Heinz Schattner; Germany | 395.0 kg |

== Medal table ==
| Rank | Nation | Gold | Silver | Bronze | Total |
|---|---|---|---|---|---|
| 1 | Germany | 2 | 1 | 4 | 7 |
| 2 | United States | 2 | 0 | 0 | 2 |
| 3 | Austria | 1 | 2 | 1 | 4 |
| 4 | Czechoslovakia | 0 | 1 | 0 | 1 |
| 4 | France | 0 | 1 | 0 | 1 |
| Totals (5 entries) | | 5 | 5 | 5 | 15 |
