= Weightlifting at the 1936 Summer Olympics – Men's 60 kg =

Weightlifting at the Olympics

The men's featherweight event was part of the weightlifting programme at the 1936 Summer Olympics in Berlin. The weight class was the lightest contested, and allowed weightlifters of up to 60 kilograms (132 pounds). The competition was held on Sunday, 2 August 1936. Twenty-one weightlifters from 13 nations competed.

== Medalists ==
Gold	Silver	Bronze
Anthony Terlazzo; United States	Saleh Soliman; Egypt	Ibrahim Shams; Egypt

== Records ==
These were the standing world and Olympic records (in kilograms) prior to the 1936 Summer Olympics.

World Record	Press	95.5	(Germany) Hans Wölpert	Benneckenstein (GER)	1936
World Record	Snatch	>97.5	(Soviet Union) Georgi Popov		
World Record	Clean & Jerk	>125.5	?		
World Record	Total	>297	?		
Olympic Record	Press	92.5	(Germany) Hans Wölpert	Amsterdam (NED)	28 July 1928
Olympic Record	Press	92.5	(Italy) Giuseppe Conca	Amsterdam (NED)	28 July 1928
Olympic Record	Snatch	90	(Austria) Franz Andrysek	Amsterdam (NED)	28 July 1928
Olympic Record	Snatch	90	(Italy) Pierino Gabetti	Amsterdam (NED)	28 July 1928
Olympic Record	Clean & Jerk	120	(Austria) Franz Andrysek	Amsterdam (NED)	28 July 1928
Olympic Record	Total	287.5	(Austria) Franz Andrysek	Amsterdam (NED)	28 July 1928
Olympic Record	Total	287.5	(France) Raymond Suvigny	Los Angeles (USA)	31 July 1932

Anthony Terlazzo and Georg Liebsch both equalized the standing Olympic record in press with 92.5 kilograms. Anthony Terlazzo and Anton Richter both improved the Olympic record in snatch with 97.5 kilograms. Saleh Soliman and Ibrahim Shams both bettered the Olympic record in clean and jerk with 125 kilograms, and Anthony Terlazzo set a new Olympic record in total with 312.5 kilograms.

== Results ==
All figures in kilograms.

Place	Weightlifter	Body weight	Press			Snatch			Clean & jerk			Total
Place	Weightlifter	Body weight	1.	2.	3.	1.	2.	3.	1.	2.	3.	Total
1	Anthony Terlazzo (USA)	60.0	87.5	92.5	X (95)	90	95	97.5	122.5	X (127.5)	X (127.5)	312.5
2	Saleh Soliman (EGY)	59.5	77.5	82.5	85	87.5	X (92.5)	95	115	122.5	125	305
3	Ibrahim Shams (EGY)	59.5	72.5	77.5	80	90	95	X (97.5)	120	125	X (127.5)	300
4	Anton Richter (AUT)	59.8	72.5	77.5	80	90	95	97.5	120	X (125)	X (125)	297.5
5	Georg Liebsch (GER)	59.4	87.5	92.5	X (95)	85	X (90)	90	107.5	X (112.5)	X (112.5)	290
6	Attilio Bescapè (ITA)	60.0	80	85	X (87.5)	85	90	X (92.5)	X (110)	110	X (115)	287.5
7	John Terry (USA)	60.0	75	X (80)	X (80)	87.5	X (92.5)	92.5	115	X (120)	120	287.5
8	Max Walter (GER)	59.0	75	X (80)	X (80)	X (90)	X (90)	90	115	X (122.5)	X (122.5)	280
9	Umberto Brizzi (ITA)	60.0	80	85	X (87.5)	75	80	82.5	X (110)	110	X (115)	277.5
10	Marcel Baril (FRA)	60.0	70	75	X (77.5)	82.5	X (87.5)	87.5	110	112.5	X (115)	275
11	Antoine Verdu (FRA)	60.0	X (72.5)	77.5	X (80)	82.5	87.5	X (90)	X (110)	X (110)	110	275
12	Mathias Zahradka (AUT)	59.7	75	80	X (82.5)	82.5	X (87.5)	X (87.5)	105	X (110)	110	272.5
13	Erm Lund (EST)	59.8	67.5	72.5	X (75)	80	X (85)	85	107.5	112.5	X (117.5)	270
14	Alois Rigert (SUI)	59.9	75	85	X (87.5)	X (75)	75	80	100	X (105)	105	270
15	Norman Holroyd (GBR)	58.8	67.5	72.5	X (75)	70	75	80	105	X (112.5)	X (112.5)	262.5
16	Wong Seahkee (ROC)	58.6	65	70	X (72.5)	75	-	-	105	X (115)	X (115)	255
17	Jenő Kuti (HUN)	59.4	70	X (75)	75	70	75	77.5	90	95	100	252.5
18	František Šimůnek (TCH)	60.0	65	70	X (72.5)	X (75)	75	80	95	100	X (105)	250
19	Fred Marsh (GBR)	59.4	67.5	X (72.5)	X (72.5)	77.5	X (82.5)	X (82.5)	102.5	X (107.5)	X (110)	247.5
20	Seng Liang (ROC)	59.4	72.5	-	-	70	75	X (80)	X (90)	95	X (100)	247.5
21	Franz Conrad (LUX)	58.4	65	X (70)	X (72.5)	65	-	-	X (90)	X (90)	90	220

== Sources ==
- Olympic Report
- Wudarski, Pawel (1999). "Wyniki Igrzysk Olimpijskich" (in Polish).
