= Steve Stanko =

American weightlifter and bodybuilder

Personal information
- Born: September 5, 1917 Perth Amboy, New Jersey, U.S.
- Died: December 31, 1978 (aged 61)
- Height: 5 ft 11 in (180 cm)
- Weight: 223 lb (101 kg)

Sport
- Sport: Weightlifting
Medal record
Representing United States
World Championships
Silver medal – second place	1938 Vienna	+82.5 kg
- Updated on October 8, 2016

Steve Stanko (September 5, 1917 – December 31, 1978) was an American heavyweight weightlifter and bodybuilder. In weightlifting he won a silver medal at the 1938 World Championships and set three unofficial world records in 1941: in the snatch, clean and jerk and in the total. In bodybuilding he was crowned Mr. America in 1944, Most Muscular Man in America in 1946, and Mr. Universe in 1947.

Stanko grew up in Perth Amboy, New Jersey and was spotted by Bob Hoffman, who convinced Stanko to move to York, Pennsylvania to work at York Barbell and develop his physique.
