= Frederick Marsh =

Frederick Marsh may refer to:

- Frederick Marsh (cricketer) (1875–1927), English cricketer
- Frederick Dana Marsh (1872–1961), American illustrator
- Howard Marsh (surgeon) (Frederick Howard Marsh, 1839–1915), surgeon and academic

== See also ==
- Fred Marsh (1924–2006), American infielder in Major League Baseball
- Fred Marsh (weightlifter), British weightlifter
- F. S. Marsh (Fred Shipley Marsh, 1886–1953), English clergyman and theologian
