= Switala =

Switala or Świtała, sometimes respelled Switalla, Schwitalla, or Schwitalle, is a surname. Notable people with the surname include:

- Carole Switala (1946–2016), American puppeteer, singer and voice actor
- Kazimierz Świtała (1923–2011), Polish politician and interior minister
- Karl Schwitalle (1906–1945), German weightlifter
- Marcos Switala MSc (born 1983), Brazilian automotive Mechanical Engineer, notable contribution to the global mobility industry
