= Rigert =

Rigert is a German surname. Notable people with the surname include:

- Alois Rigert (1906–?), Swiss weightlifter
- David Rigert (born 1947), Russian weightlifter
- Yelena Rigert (born 1983), Russian hammer thrower
