= Mohamed Geisa =

Egyptian weightlifter

Personal information
- Full name: Mohamed Ahmed Geisa
- Born: 10 May 1913

Sport
- Country: Egypt
- Sport: Weightlifting
- Weight class: +90 kg
- Team: National team
Medal record
Men's Weightlifting
Representing Egypt
World Championships
Bronze medal – third place	1946 Paris	+90 kg
Bronze medal – third place	1951 Milan	+90 kg
- Updated on 8 October 2016

Mohamed Ahmed Geisa (10 May 1913 – before 12 December 2003) was an Egyptian male weightlifter, who competed in the heavyweight class and represented Egypt at international competitions. He won the bronze medal at the 1946 and 1951 World Weightlifting Championships in the +90 kg category. He also competed in weightlifting at the 1936 Summer Olympics.
