= Umberto Brizzi =

Italian weightlifter

Umberto Brizzi (10 January 1908 – 28 August 1991) was an Italian weightlifter. In the 1936 Summer Olympics, he finished ninth in the featherweight class.
