= Josef Manger =

German weightlifter (1913–1991)

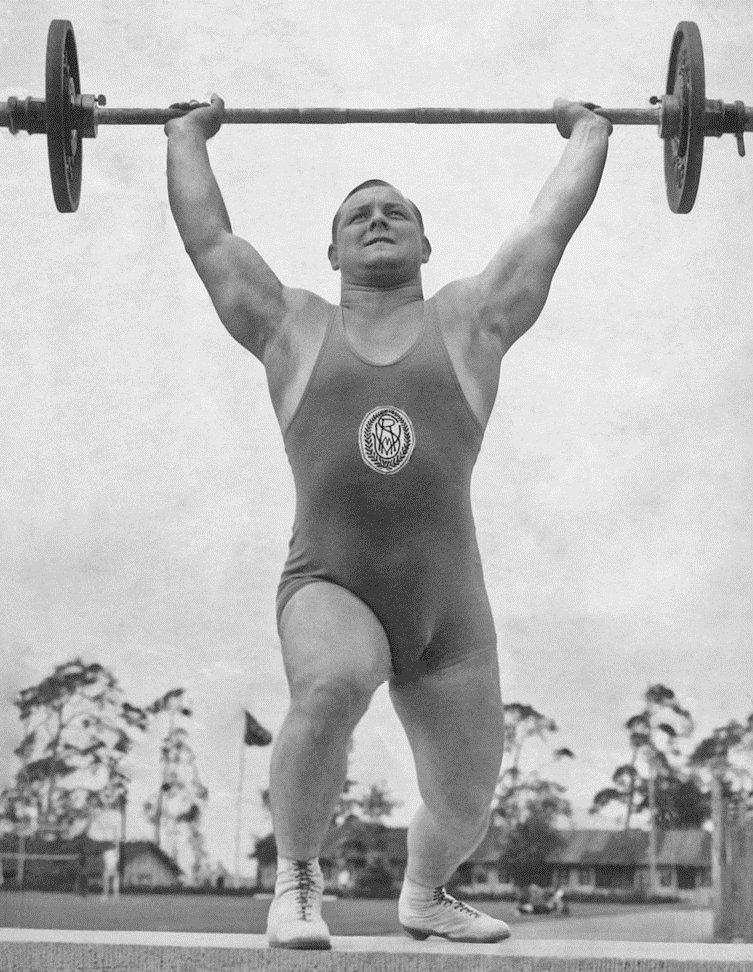
- Josef Manger c. 1936

Personal information
- Born: 26 May 1913 Bamberg, Germany
- Died: 13 March 1991 (aged 77) Tutzing, Germany

Sport
- Sport: Weightlifting
- Club: SC Roland Bamberg
Medal record
Men's weightlifting
Representing Germany
Olympic Games
| Gold medal – first place | 1936 Berlin | +82.5 kg |
World championships
| Gold medal – first place | 1937 Paris | +82.5 kg |
| Gold medal – first place | 1938 Vienna | +82.5 kg |
European championships
| Silver medal – second place | 1934 Genoa | +82.5 kg |
| Gold medal – first place | 1935 Paris | +82.5 kg |

Josef Manger (26 May 1913 – 13 March 1991) was a German heavyweight weightlifter who won a European title in 1935, an Olympic gold medal in 1936, and two world titles in 1937 and 1938. Between 1935 and 1941 he set 11 ratified world records, ten in the press and one in the snatch. His career was cut short by World War II, after which he worked as a salesman. A street in Bamberg, his hometown, was named in his honor.
