= Wong Seahkee =

Chinese weightlifter

Personal information
- Nationality: Chinese
- Born: 5 June 1913

Sport
- Sport: Weightlifting

Wong Seahkee (born 5 June 1913, date of death unknown) was a Chinese weightlifter. He competed in the men's featherweight event at the 1936 Summer Olympics.
