= 1938 World Weightlifting Championships =

International weightlifting competition

1938 Men's World Championships
- Host city: Vienna, Nazi Germany
- Dates: October 21–23, 1938

The 1938 Men's World Weightlifting Championships were held in Vienna, Nazi Germany from October 21 to October 23, 1938. There were 38 men in action from 11 nations.

== Medal summary ==
Event	Gold		Silver		Bronze	
Featherweight; 60 kg	Georg Liebsch; Germany	305.0 kg	Attilio Bescapè; Italy	300.0 kg	Anton Richter; Austria	297.5 kg
Lightweight; 67.5 kg	Tony Terlazzo; United States	350.0 kg	Attia Hamouda; Egypt	342.5 kg	Karl Schwitalle; Germany	332.5 kg
Middleweight; 75 kg	Adolf Wagner; Germany	367.5 kg	Rudolf Ismayr; Germany	360.0 kg	John Terpak; United States	357.5 kg
Light heavyweight 82.5 kg	John Davis; United States	387.5 kg	Fritz Haller; Austria	377.5 kg	Louis Hostin; France	372.5 kg
Heavyweight +82.5 kg	Josef Manger; Germany	410.0 kg	Steve Stanko; United States	397.5 kg	Arnold Luhaäär; Estonia	390.0 kg

== Medal table ==
Rank	Nation	Gold	Silver	Bronze	Total
1	Germany	3	1	1	5
2	United States	2	1	1	4
3	Austria	0	1	1	2
4	Egypt	0	1	0	1
4	Italy	0	1	0	1
6	Estonia	0	0	1	1
6	France	0	0	1	1
Totals (7 entries)		5	5	5	15
