= František Šimůnek (weightlifter) =

Czech weightlifter

Personal information
- Nationality: Czech
- Born: 2 April 1908

Sport
- Sport: Weightlifting

František Šimůnek (born 2 April 1908, date of death unknown) was a Czech weightlifter. He competed in the men's featherweight event at the 1936 Summer Olympics.
