= Franz Conrad (weightlifter) =

Luxembourgish weightlifter

Personal information
- Nationality: Luxembourgish
- Born: 22 March 1913; Schifflange, Luxembourg
- Died: 1942 (aged 28–29)

Sport
- Sport: Weightlifting

Franz Conrad (22 March 1913 – 1942) was a Luxembourgish weightlifter. He competed in the men's featherweight event at the 1936 Summer Olympics.
