= 1946 World Weightlifting Championships =

International weightlifting competition

1946 Men's World Championships
- Host city: Paris, France
- Dates: October 18–19, 1946

The 1946 Men's World Weightlifting Championships were held in Paris, France, from October 18 to October 19, 1946. There were 79 men in action from 13 nations.

== Medal summary ==
Event	Gold		Silver		Bronze	
Featherweight; 60 kg	Arvid Andersson; Sweden	320.0 kg	Mahmoud Fayad; Egypt	317.5 kg	Moisey Kasyanik; Soviet Union	310.0 kg
Lightweight; 67.5 kg	Stanley Stanczyk; United States	367.5 kg	Vladimir Svetilko; Soviet Union	347.5 kg	Georgi Popov; Soviet Union	335.0 kg
Middleweight; 75 kg	Khadr El-Touni; Egypt	377.5 kg	John Terpak; United States	375.0 kg	Frank Spellman; United States	372.5 kg
Light heavyweight 82.5 kg	Grigory Novak; Soviet Union	425.0 kg	Frank Kay; United States	390.0 kg	Henri Ferrari; France	390.0 kg
Heavyweight +82.5 kg	John Davis; United States	435.0 kg	Yakov Kutsenko; Soviet Union	415.0 kg	Mohamed Geisa; Egypt	395.0 kg

== Medal table ==
Rank	Nation	Gold	Silver	Bronze	Total
1	United States	2	2	1	5
2	Soviet Union	1	2	2	5
3	Egypt	1	1	1	3
4	Sweden	1	0	0	1
5	France	0	0	1	1
Totals (5 entries)		5	5	5	15
