= Anton Richter =

Austrian weightlifter (1911–1989)

Personal information
- Born: 7 December 1911
- Died: 15 August 1989 (aged 77)

Sport
- Country: Austria
- Sport: Weightlifting
- Weight class: 60 kg
- Club: Polizei SV, Wien (AUT)
- Team: National team
Medal record
Men's Weightlifting
Representing Austria
World Championships
Silver medal – second place	1937 Paris	60 kg
Bronze medal – third place	1938 Vienna	60 kg
- Updated on 6 October 2016

Anton Richter (7 December 1911 – 15 August 1989) was an Austrian male weightlifter, who competed in the featherweight class and represented Austria at international competitions. He won the silver medal at the 1937 World Weightlifting Championships in the 60 kg category. He participated at the 1936 Summer Olympics in the 60 kg event. He set one world record in the featherweight clean & jerk and one in the featherweight total.
