= Georgi Popov (weightlifter) =

Soviet weightlifter (1912–1974)

Personal information
- Born: 12 December 1912 Baku, Azerbaijan
- Died: 13 April 1974 (aged 61) Kyiv, Ukraine

Sport
- Sport: Weightlifting
- Club: Dynamo, Spartak
Medal record
Representing the Soviet Union
World Weightlifting Championships
| Bronze medal – third place | 1946 Paris | Lightweight |
European Weightlifting Championships
| Silver medal – second place | 1947 Helsinki | Lightweight |

Georgi Vladimirovich Popov (Russian: Георгий Владимирович Попов; 12 December 1912 – 13 April 1974) was a Soviet weightlifter. In 1946 he won a bronze medal at the world championships, and next year a European silver. Between 1934 and 1939 he set 20 unofficial world records in various events.

During his 33-year-long career Popov competed in all weight categories, from featherweight to heavyweight. In retirement he worked as a weightlifting coach. He was a vocal opponent of doping in sport.
