= Fritz Haller (weightlifter) =

Austrian weightlifter (1905–1960)

Fritz Hala
Personal information
- Full name: Friedrich Hala
- Born: 13 June 1905 Himberg am Wald, Lower Austria, Austria
- Died: 8 November 1960 (aged 55) Vienna, Austria

Sport
- Country: Austria
- Sport: Weightlifting
- Weight class: 82.5 kg
- Team: National team
Medal record
Men's Weightlifting
Representing Austria
World Championships
Gold medal – first place	1937 Paris	82.5 kg
Silver medal – second place	1938 Vienna	82.5 kg
- Updated on 6 October 2016

Friedrich "Fritz" Hala (13 June 1905 – 8 November 1960) was an Austrian weightlifter, who competed in the light heavyweight class and represented Austria at international competitions. He won the gold medal at the 1937 World Weightlifting Championships and the silver medal at the 1938 World Weightlifting Championships, both in the 82.5 kg category. He also competed at the 1936 Summer Olympics and the 1948 Summer Olympics. Hala died in Vienna on 8 November 1960, at the age of 55.
