= Norman Holroyd =

British weightlifter (1914–2002)

Personal information
- Nationality: British
- Born: 8 May 1914 Halifax, England
- Died: 25 June 2002 (aged 88)

Sport
- Sport: Weightlifting

Norman Holroyd (8 May 1914 – 25 June 2002) was a British weightlifter. He competed in the men's featherweight event at the 1936 Summer Olympics.

In the 1930s, Holroyd trained at Bradford College Physical Culture Club. In April, 1937 he was the first English weightlifter to Clean and jerk double body weight. He was British Champion nine times.
