= York Barbell =

Fitness product manufacturer based in York, Pennsylvania, U.S.

- Founded: 1932
- Headquarters: Manchester Township, Pennsylvania, U.S. York mailing address
- Products: barbells, weight plates
- Website: www.yorkbarbell.com

York Barbell is an American-based international manufacturer of fitness equipment. Its roots date back to when Bob Hoffman, who was named "Father of World Weightlifting" by the International Weightlifting Federation, bought Alan Calvert's 1902 Milo Barbell Company and founded York Barbell in 1932. As a prolific writer of books and articles, Hoffman promoted the benefits of exercise and nutrition.

Among the company's first employees were weightlifters Tony Terlazzo and John Terpak.

Hoffman began creating barbells in 1929, the same year he began to host meets in the oil burner factory. During the 1932, Los Angeles Olympics, Hoffman noticed how the teams from other countries looked down upon the America weightlifting team. The same year Hoffman opened the York Barbell Company and began promoting weightlifting. Hoffman reached out to ostracized minorities of the time to train and compete at York Barbell. During the Second World War, York Barbell supplied barbells to the United States military. When the war ended, the demand for barbells increased due to the military personnel returning home who had been exposed to weightlifting during the war. After the war, company machinist Frank Spellman won a gold medal at the 1948 Olympics in Men's 75 kg Weightlifting, setting Olympic middleweight (165 pound) records in the clean & jerk (336.25 pounds) and the total lift (859.5 pounds).

From the decades of the 1930s through the 1970s, York Barbell sponsored over 40 national champions and numerous Olympic gold medalists, a few of whom are featured in one of the murals of York, Pennsylvania. Today, the corporate office of York Barbell Company houses the official Weightlifting Hall of Fame and Museum and continues to host a variety of powerlifting and bodybuilding competitions.

For a time, the company had a food supplement business, which was involved in several violations of the law. During several occasions (1960, 1961, 1968, 1972 and 1974), the company's products were seized by the Food and Drug Administration, and in a 1968 consent decree it agreed to stop a long list of questionable health claims for their products. The fact that Bob Hoffman owned this company, was a weightlifting coach and a founding member of the President's Council on Physical Fitness and Sports, as well as Hoffman's athletic career, helped make him "a major factor in the growth of nutritional fads for athletes", according to alternative medicine critic Stephen Barrett.

== See also ==
- Alan Calvert, the company's 1902 founder, before it was sold and renamed
