= Seng Liang =

Chinese weightlifter

Personal information
- Nationality: Chinese
- Born: 27 January 1913

Chinese name
- Chinese: 沈良
- Hanyu Pinyin: Shěn Liáng

Sport
- Sport: Weightlifting

Seng Liang (born 27 January 1913, date of death unknown) was a Chinese weightlifter. He competed in the men's featherweight event at the 1936 Summer Olympics.
