= Marcel Baril =

French weightlifter

Personal information
- Nationality: French
- Born: 13 November 1905; Laval, Mayenne, France
- Died: 29 January 1979 (aged 73); Saint-Herblain, Loire-Atlantique, France

Sport
- Sport: Weightlifting

Marcel Auguste André Baril (13 November 1905 – 29 January 1979) was a French weightlifter. He competed in the men's featherweight event at the 1936 Summer Olympics.
