= Saleh Soliman =

Egyptian weightlifter (born 1916)

Olympic medal record

Representing Egypt

Men's Weightlifting
Silver medal – second place	1936 Berlin	-60 kg

Saleh Mohamed Soliman (born 24 June 1916, date of death unknown) was an Egyptian weightlifter who competed in the 1936 Summer Olympics.

In 1936 he won the silver medal in the featherweight class. Soliman is deceased.

== Sources ==
- Profile
