= Antoine Verdu =

French weightlifter

Personal information
- Nationality: French
- Born: 11 May 1915
- Died: 14 March 2002 (aged 86)

Sport
- Sport: Weightlifting

Antoine Verdu (11 May 1915 – 14 March 2002) was a French weightlifter. He competed in the men's featherweight event at the 1936 Summer Olympics.
