= Jenő Kuti =

Hungarian weightlifter

Personal information
- Nationality: Hungarian
- Born: 20 August 1909

Sport
- Sport: Weightlifting

Jenő Kuti (born 20 August 1909, date of death unknown) was a Hungarian weightlifter. He competed in the men's featherweight event at the 1936 Summer Olympics.
