= Hans Valla =

Austrian weightlifter (1909–1978)

Johann Josef "Hans" Valla
Personal information
- Born: 1 May 1909 Vienna, Austria-Hungary
- Died: 21 December 1978 (aged 69) Vienna, Austria

Sport
- Country: Austria
- Sport: Weightlifting
- Weight class: 75 kg
- Team: National team
Medal record
Men's Weightlifting
Representing Austria
World Championships
Bronze medal – third place	1937 Paris	75 kg
- Updated on 6 October 2016

Hans Valla (1 May 1909 – 21 December 1978) was an Austrian weightlifter, who competed in the middleweight class and represented Austria at international competitions. He won the bronze medal at the 1937 World Weightlifting Championships in the 75 kg category. He also competed at the 1936 Summer Olympics.
