= Erm Lund =

Estonian weightlifter (1914–2003)

Personal information
- Nationality: Estonian
- Born: 7 February 1914 Tallinn, Estonia
- Died: 22 January 2003 (aged 88) Tallinn, Estonia

Sport
- Sport: Weightlifting

Erm Lund (7 February 1914 – 22 January 2003) was an Estonian weightlifter. Lund began training at the Tallinn Workers' Sports Association under the guidance of Arnold Luhaäär. He competed in the men's featherweight event at the 1936 Summer Olympics.
