= Mathias Zahradka =

Austrian weightlifter

Personal information
- Nationality: Austrian
- Born: 16 January 1912 Vienna, Austria-Hungary
- Died: 28 May 1982 (aged 70) Vienna, Austria

Sport
- Sport: Weightlifting

Mathias Zahradka (16 January 1912 – 28 May 1982) was an Austrian weightlifter. He competed in the men's featherweight event at the 1936 Summer Olympics.
