= Heinz Schattner =

German weightlifter

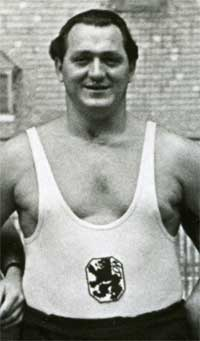

Personal information
- Born: 20 June 1912 Danzig, West Prussia, German Empire (modern Gdańsk, Poland)
- Died: 2 February 1954 (aged 42) Clio, Michigan
- Weight: 124 kg (273 lb)

Sport
- Sport: Weightlifting
- Club: TSV 1860 München
Medal record
Representing Germany
World Championships
Bronze medal – third place	1937 Paris	Super heavyweight
European Championships
Gold medal – first place	1951 Milan	Super heavyweight
Gold medal – first place	1952 Helsinki	Super heavyweight
Gold medal – first place	1953 Stockholm	Super heavyweight

Heinz Schattner (20 June 1912 – 2 February 1954) was a German weightlifter. He competed in the super heavyweight category at the 1952 Summer Olympics and finished in fourth place. He won three consecutive European titles between 1951 and 1953 and finished third at the 1937 World Weightlifting Championships.
