= Bob Hoffman (sports promoter) =

American entrepreneur and weightlifter who owned York Barbell

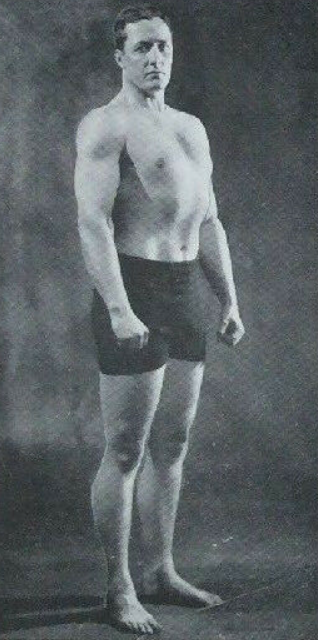
- Hoffman in 1933
- Born: Robert Collins Hoffman; November 9, 1898; Tifton, Georgia, United States
- Died: July 18, 1985 (aged 86); York, Pennsylvania, United States
- Known for: Bodybuilding, weightlifting
- Spouse: Rosetta Snell (m. 1928; div. 1944)
- Children: none (Snell had one)

Robert Collins Hoffman (November 9, 1898 – July 18, 1985) was an American entrepreneur who rose to prominence as the owner of York Barbell. He founded magazines such as Muscular Development and Strength & Health, and was the manufacturer of a line of bodybuilding supplements. Hoffman promoted bodybuilders like John Grimek and Sigmund Klein, coached the American Olympic Weightlifting Team between 1936 and 1968, and was a founding member of the President's Council on Physical Fitness and Sports.

== Early life and military service ==
Hoffman was born in November 1898 in Tifton, Georgia to parents Bertha and Addison, an engineer during construction of a nearby dam. His parents were both from Pennsylvania and he grew up in Wilkinsburg, a Pittsburgh suburb where the family moved in 1903.

At age 18 in April 1917, Hoffman enlisted in the Pennsylvania National Guard's 18th Infantry Regiment, Company A at Pittsburgh; his enlistment papers identify him as having blue eyes, dark hair, and a height of 6 feet 2 inches. As the U.S. entered World War I, his unit entered federal service as Company A of the 111th Infantry Regiment, in a newly redesignated 28th Division. Hoffman was deployed to France in May 1918 as part of the American Expeditionary Forces, with whom he was active at the front and "in numerous campaigns and engagements" including Champagne-Marne, Aisne-Marne, Oise-Aisne, and the Meuse-Argonne Offensive. He was decorated many times for bravery during the war, and received the Belgian Order of Leopold, the French Croix de Guerre and a silver star. Hoffman was promoted to Private 1st Class in December 1917, and to Corporal in February 1918. Honorably discharged from the 111th, Hoffman joined the 802nd Pioneer Infantry Regiment as an officer in late March 1919. He was slightly injured from a shell splinter in or about early July 1919, and honorably discharged from the military on August 13, 1919.

== Business career ==
To be closer to his brother, Hoffman moved to York, Pennsylvania in 1919 where he co-founded an oil burner business named the York Oil Burner Corporation. In 1923, he started the York Oil Burner Athletic Club with a team of employees from the company. In the early 1930s, Hoffman took a leadership role in the Amateur Athletic Union. In 1932, he co-founded the Strength and Health Publishing Company and began Strength & Health magazine. Hoffman bought the bankrupted Milo Barbell Company in 1935, and sold his oil burner interest in 1938 when he founded the York Barbell Company.

"During his athletic career, first as an oarsman and then as a weightlifter, he received over six hundred trophies, certificates, and awards."

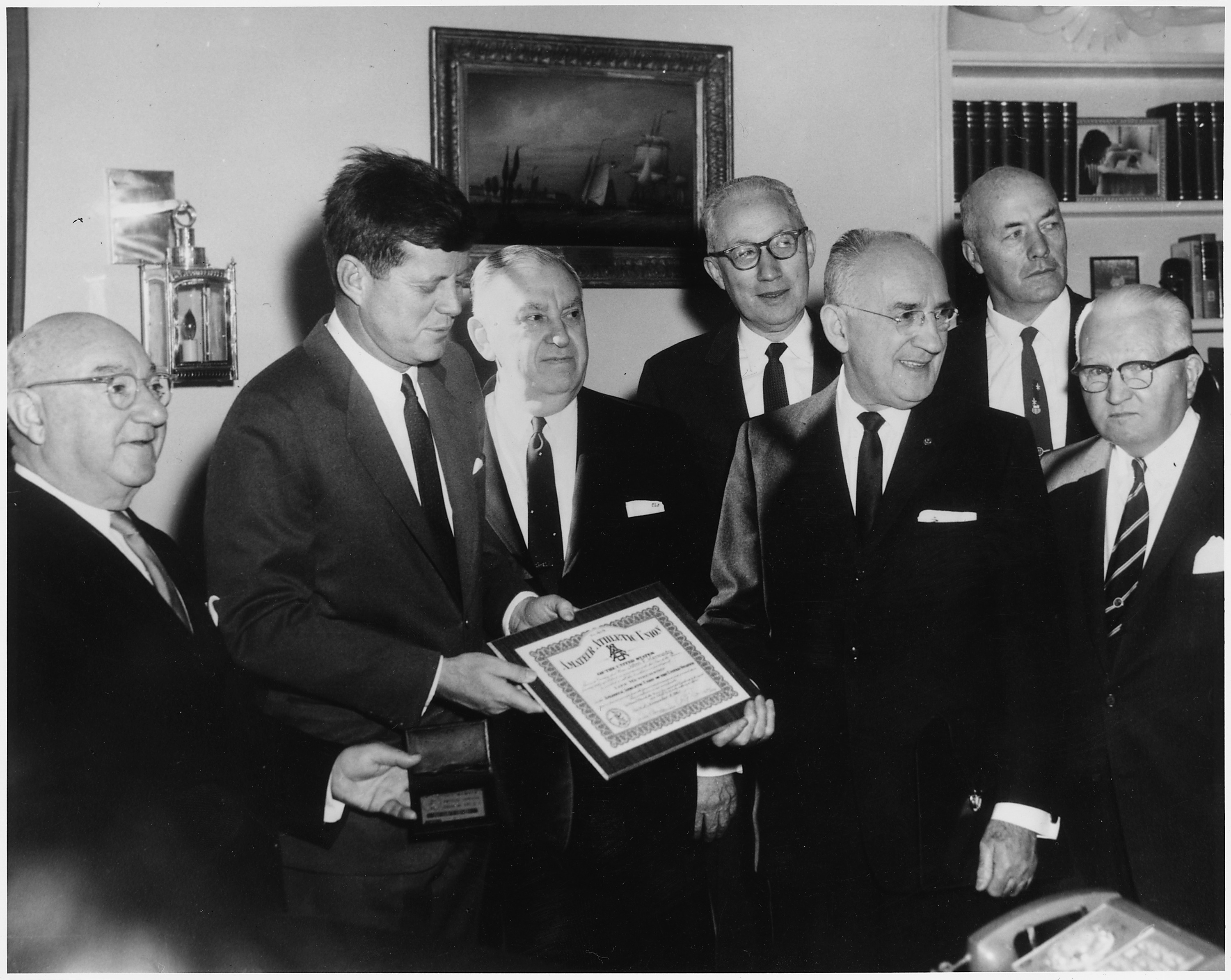
Hoffman (back right) was among those who presented President Kennedy in November 1961 with life membership in the Amateur Athletic Union.

Hoffman started Muscular Development magazine in 1964 as he began a shift from weightlifting to bodybuilding.

In December 1969, Hoffman and three other weightlifters associated with the 1968 Summer Olympics met with President Richard Nixon for seven minutes at the White House along with Pennsylvania congressman George Atlee Goodling.

His Hoffman Foundation gave him some philanthropic fame in the 1970s and he appeared in popular television shows and magazines. Until the definite ascent of the IFBB by the 1970s, Hoffman remained the single influential figure on the North American weightlifting, weight training, bodybuilding, and overall physical culture scene.

Hoffman was a leader of the National Health Federation, a pro-alternative medicine lobbying organization.

Additionally, Hoffman was an author of several books, including "How to be Strong, Healthy, and Happy" and "I Remember the Last War".

=== Controversy ===
Hoffman believed that protein supplements gave special health and muscle-building powers, a view not supported by scientific evidence. He was criticized by medical experts for marketing protein supplements with false and misleading claims. In more recent years the use of protein supplements to support muscular development has become common, though benefits and disadvantages continue to be debated.

His supplement business was involved in several brushes with the law. During several occasions (1960, 1961, 1968, 1972 and 1974), his company's products were seized by the Food and Drug Administration, and in a 1968 consent decree he and his company agreed to stop a long list of questionable health claims for their products. The fact that he sold supplements through his company, was a weightlifting coach and a founding member of the President's Council on Physical Fitness and Sports, as well as his athletic career, helped make him "a major factor in the growth of nutritional fads for athletes", according to alternative medicine critic Stephen Barrett.

== Personal life ==
On October 20, 1928, Hoffman married Rosetta Snell, a teen from a large family, who had a child from a previous marriage. The two divorced in 1944. Hoffman also had relationships with Gracie Bard, Dorcas Lehman, and lastly Alda Ketterman, with whom he was considered to have a common-law marriage.

Hoffman had heart problems later in life, which began with arrhythmia and progressed to atrial fibrillation before he underwent heart bypass surgery in early 1977. Hoffman died on July 18, 1985.

== See also ==
- John Terpak, a longtime business associate of Hoffman
