= National Health Federation =

Lobbying group

- Formation: January 1955
- Type: Health-freedom organization
- Headquarters: Monrovia, California
- Website: TheNHF.com

The National Health Federation (NHF) is a lobbying group which promotes natural medicine. The NHF is based in California and defines its mission as protecting individuals' rights to use dietary supplements and alternative therapies without government restrictions. The NHF also opposes mainstream public-health measures such as water fluoridation and compulsory childhood vaccines.

The NHF was founded by Fred J. Hart in 1955, after the U.S. Food and Drug Administration ordered him to cease marketing fraudulent radionics devices. Mainstream medical organizations have criticized the NHF for promoting dubious alternative cancer treatments and health claims; the American Cancer Society recommends that cancer patients avoid products promoted by the NHF, while Quackwatch describes the NHF as "antagonistic to accepted scientific methods as well as to current consumer-protection law."

== History and activities ==
The National Health Federation was founded in 1955 by Fred J. Hart. He promoted radionics devices. Hart founded the NHF to ensure free expression of health alternatives and disagreed with the U.S. Food and Drug Administration, compelling his company to cease marketing FDA non-authorized devices for medical treatment. Over the years, the NHF has promoted a range of alternative cancer therapies, including laetrile. According to its website, the NHF fought and won the battle for mandatory poultry inspection, coordinated a drive to help chiropractors become legally licensed in the United States, waged a campaign against water fluoridation, and advocated legislative recognition of acupuncture in the United States. The Federation has collaborated with European consumer organizations and political parties in a campaign demanding that the European Union (EU) accept the outcome of a referendum in Ireland on the Lisbon Treaty.

In the 1990s, the Federation lobbied on behalf of consumers and manufacturers to pass the Dietary Supplement Health and Education Act (DSHEA), which put into place government quality controls of dietary supplements, health claims, good manufacturing practices, and oversight by the Food and Drug Administration. The organization has promoted claims that under certain conditions, vaccines were dangerous, fought to market untested and unproven health products, and lobbied against water fluoridation. The organization publishes a quarterly newsletter, Health Freedom News. It has membership in 22 countries and has observer status at meetings of the Codex Alimentarius Commission, the highest international body on food standards.

Scott Tips is the current president of the National Health Federation. He is a California-licensed attorney, former Managing Editor of the California Law Review, and contributor to WholeFoods Magazine. Some current and former members of the NHF have been convicted of fraud related to marketing questionable medical supplements and devices. At the same time, several physicians in NHF leadership positions have had their medical licenses revoked.

== Reception ==
Several independent sources have described the National Health Federation as a fringe lobbying group or a promoter of dubious and unproven medical claims and devices. The McGraw-Hill Concise Dictionary of Modern Medicine defines the NHF as a "fringe medicine organization that exerts political pressure to secure 'health freedom' and 'freedom of medical choice' on behalf of alternative medicine practitioners, their families, and 'health food' consumers."

The American Cancer Society, noting that the NHF is "not a medical or scientific body," recommended that "persons with cancer avoid the therapies and products promoted by the National Health Federation for the treatment of cancer." Quackwatch calls NHF "an alliance of promoters and followers who engage in lobbying campaigns... and uses the words 'alternative,' and 'freedom' to suit its own purposes," adding that "NHF is antagonistic to accepted scientific methods as well as to current consumer-protection law."
