= John Terpak =

American weightlifter (1912–1993)

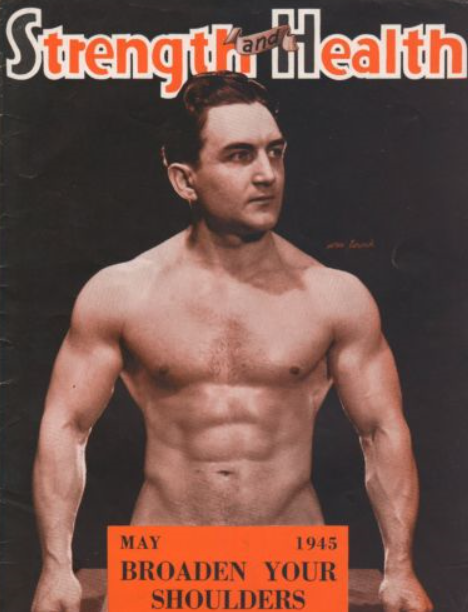
- John Terpak in 1945
- Born: John Basil Terpak; July 4, 1912; Mayfield, Pennsylvania, United States
- Died: June 1, 1993 (aged 80); Springettsbury Township, Pennsylvania, United States
- Spouse: Mildred Louis Bulk
- Children: 2
- Sports career
Medal record
Men's weightlifting
Representing the United States
World Championships
Gold medal – first place	1937 Paris	Middleweight
Gold medal – first place	1947 Philadelphia	Light heavyweight
Silver medal – second place	1946 Paris	Middleweight
Bronze medal – third place	1938 Vienna	Middleweight

John Basil Terpak (July 4, 1912 – June 1, 1993) was an American world champion weightlifter.

== Early life ==
Terpak's father was Ukrainian-born and worked in Pennsylvania's coal mines. Terpak pursued weightlifting in his youth and was noticed by Bob Hoffman in 1935 when he won the Junior Nationals lightweight class in Philadelphia. Hoffman recruited Terpak to work for York Barbell, where he became general manager in 1939.

== Olympic results ==
Terpak finished 5th at the 1936 Summer Olympics and 4th at the 1948 Summer Olympics.

== World Championship results ==
He won a gold medal at the 1937 World Weightlifting Championships and 1947 World Weightlifting Championships, a bronze medal at the 1938 World Weightlifting Championships, and a silver medal at the 1946 World Weightlifting Championships.

== Coaching ==
Terpak was a U.S. Olympic coach in 1968 and 1972. He was also a coach for two-time Olympic champion Charles Vinci.

In December 1969, Terpak and weightlifters Bob Hoffman, Joe Dube, and Bob Bednarski from the 1968 Summer Olympics met with President Richard Nixon for seven minutes at the White House along with Pennsylvania congressman George Atlee Goodling.

== Personal life ==
He was a vice president, CEO, and chairman of the board at York Barbell.
