= Max Walter (weightlifter) =

German weightlifter

Max Walter (January 30, 1905 – December 30, 1987) was a German weightlifter who competed in the 1936 Summer Olympics. He was born in Metz, France and died in Duisburg. In 1936 he finished eighth in the featherweight class.
