= Arnie Sundberg =

American weightlifter (1906–1970)

Arnie Enar Sundberg (January 1, 1906 – January 21, 1970) was an American weightlifter who competed in the 1932 Summer Olympics.

He was born in Astoria, Oregon. Married to Ione Markwell, had four kids; Pat, Arnie, Ione and Vilas.

In 1932 he finished fifth in the lightweight class.
