= Alois Rigert =

Swiss weightlifter

Personal information
- Nationality: Swiss
- Born: 18 July 1906
- Died: date unknown

Sport
- Sport: Weightlifting

Alois Rigert (born 18 July 1906, date of death unknown) was a Swiss weightlifter. He competed in the men's featherweight event at the 1936 Summer Olympics.
