= List of United States women's national weightlifting champions =

This is a yearly list of the women's American weightlifting champions.

== Champions by year ==
As of 29 June 2025

Athlete	Weight class	Year	Hometown/Team	Total
Dianna Irizarry	48 kg	2025	Kuma Weightlifting	174 kg
Isabella Rodriguez	53 kg	2025	Unaffiliated	180 kg
Miranda Ulrey	58 kg	2025	Fourteen Forty Collective	217 kg
Katharine Estep	63 kg	2025	Alpha Barbell	229 kg
Estelle Rohr	69 kg	2025	Bexar Barbell	222 kg
Mattie Rogers	77 kg	2025	Catalyst Athletics	241 kg
Jenny Arthur	86 kg	2025	Vardanian Weightlifting	243 kg
Mary Theisen-Lappen	+86 kg	2025	1 Kilo	258 kg
Cicely Kyle	45 kg	2024	Power and Grace Performance	162 kg
Kaylin White	49 kg	2024	Bexar Barbell	166 kg
Jourdan Delacruz	55 kg	2024	Power and Grace Performance	198 kg
Charley Leonard	59 kg	2024	People's Republic of the Dojo	194 kg
Carly Audia	64 kg	2024	Gravis High Performance	207 kg
Olivia Reeves	71 kg	2024	Unaffiliated	271 kg
Mariah Park	76 kg	2024	Unaffiliated	230 kg
Anna McElderry	81 kg	2024	Garage Strength	226 kg
Kateri Peters	87 kg	2024	Basa Weightlifting	229 kg
Mary Theisen-Lappen	+87 kg	2024	1 Kilo	273 kg
Gretchen Villa	45 kg	2023	Alee Athletics	152 kg
Isabella Rodriguez	49 kg	2023	Power and Grace Performance	167 kg
Asia Gonzalez	55 kg	2023	Florida Elite	180 kg
Shayla Moore	59 kg	2023	Power and Grace Performance	208 kg
Taylor Lucas	64 kg	2023	Superfly Barbell Club	205 kg
Alexia Gonzalez	71 kg	2023	Florida Elite	215 kg
Andrea Barrows	76 kg	2023	Keep Pulling	207 kg
Shacasia Johnson	81 kg	2023	Team Aita	246 kg
Sarah Barnett	87 kg	2023	Florida Elite	226 kg
Sarah Uschmann	+87 kg	2023	CHFP Weightlifting	230 kg
Angelique Reed	45 kg	2022	Archon Weightlifting	146 kg
Miranda Ulrey	49 kg	2022	Fourte	166 kg
Maddison Pannell	55 kg	2022	California Strength	196 kg
Taylor Wilkins	59 kg	2022	Florida Elite	214 kg
Danielle Gunnin	64 kg	2022	Atlas Weightlifting Club	218 kg
Meredith Alwine	71 kg	2022	Florida Elite	238 kg
Mattie Rogers	76 kg	2022	Catalyst Athletics	252 kg
Maci Winn	81 kg	2022	Praxis Weightlifting	234 kg
Laura Alexander	87 kg	2022	Catalyst Athletics	240 kg
Mary Theisen-Lappen	+87 kg	2022	1Kilo	271 kg
Katie Grob	45 kg	2021	Philadelphia Barbell	130 kg
Hayley Reichardt	49 kg	2021	Garage Strength	183 kg
Janyce Okamoto	55 kg	2021	Team Juggernaut	177 kg
Kelly Wild	59 kg	2021	California Strength	200 kg
Jaclyn Long	64 kg	2021	RVA Weightlifting	205 kg
Meredith Alwine	71 kg	2021	Team O.C.	239 kg
Kate Vibert	76 kg	2021	Power and Grace Performance	240 kg
Mattie Rogers	81 kg	2021	Catalyst Athletics	255 kg
Laura Alexander	87 kg	2021	Catalyst Athletics	237 kg
Mary Theisen-Lappen	+87 kg	2021	1Kilo	267 kg
Cicely Kyle	45 kg	2020	Power and Grace Performance	170 kg
Jourdan Delacruz	49 kg	2020	Power and Grace Performance	192 kg
Jessica Saxon	55 kg	2020	Philadelphia Barbell	184 kg
Kelly Wild	59 kg	2020	California Strength	197 kg
Mathlynn Sasser	64 kg	2020	Uplift Weightlifting	222 kg
Meredith Alwine	71 kg	2020	Florida Elite	244 kg
Mattie Rogers	76 kg	2020	Catalyst Athletics	243 kg
Jessie Bradley Stemo	81 kg	2020	Power and Grace Performance	246 kg
Juliana Riotto	87 kg	2020	Catalyst Athletics	236 kg
Sarah Robles	+87 kg	2020	Team Houston	272 kg
Gretchen Villa	45 kg	2019		150 kg
Sarah Wright	49 kg	2019	East Coast Gold	167 kg
Caitlin Hogan	55 kg	2019		194 kg
Hunter Elam	59 kg	2019	Mash Mafia	206 kg
Danielle Gunnin	64 kg	2019		209 kg
Alexandra LaChance	71 kg	2019	Team Juggernaut	227 kg
Shacasia Johnson	76 kg	2019		236 kg
Jessie Bradley	81 kg	2019	Power and Grace Performance	232 kg
Samantha Kleinschmidt	87 kg	2019	Catalyst Athletics	218 kg
Sarah Robles	+87 kg	2019	Team Houston	252 kg
Kathleen Winters	48 kg	2018		172 kg
Jourdan Delacruz	53 kg	2018	Power and Grace Performance	191 kg
Jennyfer Roberts	58 kg	2018		195 kg
Jessica Lucero	63 kg	2018		201 kg
Kate Vibert	69 kg	2018		227 kg
Shacasia Johnson	75 kg	2018		230 kg
Marissa Klingseis	90 kg	2018		240 kg
Sarah Robles	+90 kg	2018	Team Houston	250 kg
Alyssa Ritchey	48 kg	2017	Team Juggernaut	174 kg
Caitlin Hogan	53 kg	2017		190 kg
Jessica Lucero	58 kg	2017	Catalyst Athletics	208 kg
Jaclyn Long-Alberts	63 kg	2017		201 kg
Mattie Rogers	69 kg	2017		239 kg
Taylar Stallings	75 kg	2017		223 kg
Alexandria Ludwig	90 kg	2017		226 kg
Sarah Robles	+90 kg	2017	Team Houston	270 kg
Decia Agnew	75 kg	1991	Minnesota	177 kg
Decia Agnew	83 kg	1993	Minnesota Precision	195 kg
Decia Agnew	83 kg	1994		190 kg
Decia Agnew	83 kg	1995	Minnesota Precision	202 kg
Decia Agnew	83 kg	1996	Minnesota Precision	200 kg
Decia Agnew	+83 kg	1997	Minnesota Precision	207 kg
Chioma Amaechi	+75 kg	2013	Hassle Free Barbell	240 kg
Aimee Anaya	69 kg	2007	Team Southern California	198 kg
Jody Anderson	75 kg	1984		170 kg
Jody Anderson	75 kg	1986		180 kg
Stephanie Armitage-Johnson	+82.5 kg	1990		155 kg
Jenny Arthur	75 kg	2014	Team Georgia	229 kg
Jenny Arthur	75 kg	2015	Team Georgia	219 kg
Jenny Arthur	75 kg	2016	Team Georgia	239 kg
Karyn Bastiamsen	75 kg	1981		145 kg
Karyn Bastiamsen	75 kg	1982		147.5 kg
Karyn Bastiamsen	82.5 kg	1983		170 kg
Karyn Bastiamsen	+82.5 kg	1984		202.5 kg
Karyn Bastiamsen	+82.5 kg	1985		220 kg
Karyn Bastiamsen	82.5 kg	1987		200 kg
Karyn Bastiamsen	82.5 kg	1988	Metrofit	222.5 kg
Karyn Bastiamsen	+82.5 kg	1989	Metrofit	232.5 kg
Karyn Bastiamsen	82.5 kg	1991	Metrofit	195 kg
Courtney Batchlor	58 kg	2013	Gayle Hatch Weightlifters	184 kg
Courtney Batchlor	58 kg	2014	Gayle Hatch Weightlifters	191 kg
Maro Behakjian	56 kg	1987		125 kg
Kim Bensuden	60 kg	1981		102.5 kg
Sarah Bertram	69 kg	2009	Heavy Athletics	194 kg
Sarah Bertram	69 kg	2011	Heavy Athletics	197 kg
Jackie Berube	58 kg	2001	Sayre Park	195 kg
Jackie Berube	58 kg	2002	unattached	185 kg
Jackie Berube	58 kg	2004	Windy City Weightlifters	187.5 kg
Jackie Berube	58 kg	2005	Windy City Weightlifters	192.5 kg
Jackie Berube	58 kg	2006	Windy City Weightlifters	197 kg
Jackie Berube	58 kg	2008	Windy City Weightlifters	194 kg
Jackie Berube	63 kg	2009	Windy City Weightlifters	194 kg
Pamela Bickler	44 kg	1982		85 kg
Stacie Blaskowski	69 kg	2000	Minnesota Precision	215 kg
Stacie Blaskowski	69 kg	2001	unattached	200 kg
Stephanie Bodie	59 kg	1993	Team Savannah	155 kg
Stephanie Bodie	64 kg	1995	Team Savannah	165 kg
Stephanie Bodie	63 kg	1999	Team Savannah	182.5 kg
Annette Bohach	+82.5 kg	1986		165 kg
Annette Bohach	+82.5 kg	1987		175 kg
Carrie Boudreau	53 kg	2000	Reno's Weightlifting Club	160 kg
Lisa Brien	+83 kg	1995	Wesley	197.5 kg
Loreen Briner	48 kg	1998	Team Oklahoma	150 kg
Loreen Briner	48 kg	2001	Team Oklahoma	145 kg
Loreen Briner	48 kg	2002	US Stars	147.5 kg
Quin Burgess	48 kg	1981		87.5 kg
Christy Byrd	50 kg	1993	Coffee's Gym	127.5 kg
Robin Byrd	48 kg	1988	Coffee's Gym	135 kg
Robin Byrd	52 kg	1989	Coffee's Gym	140 kg
Robin Byrd	52 kg	1991	Coffee's Gym	165 kg
Robin Byrd	52 kg	1992	Newnan, GA	165 kg
Robin Byrd	54 kg	1993	Coffee's Gym	177.5 kg
Robin Byrd	50 kg	1994	Coffee's Gym	172.5 kg
Robin Byrd	54 kg	1995	Coffee's Gym	170 kg
Robin Byrd	54 kg	1996	Coffee's Gym	167.5 kg
Robin Byrd	53 kg	1999	Coffee's Gym	185 kg
Robin Byrd	53 kg	2001	Coffee's Gym	170 kg
Carol Cady	82.5 kg	1985		192.5 kg
Carol Cady	82.5 kg	1986		187.5 kg
Carol Cady	+82.5 kg	1988	The Sports Palace	202.5 kg
Carol Cady	82.5 kg	1989	The Sports Palace	197.5 kg
Jane Camp	60 kg	1983		145 kg
Jane Camp	60 kg	1984		155 kg
Mary Carr	48 kg	1984		117.5 kg
Benita Carswell	82.5 kg	1984		160 kg
Mary Beth Cervenak	52 kg	1981		115 kg
Mary Beth Cervenak	56 kg	1982		125 kg
Mary Beth Cervenak	56 kg	1983		152.5 kg
Colleen Colley	56 kg	1984		157.5 kg
Colleen Colley	56 kg	1985		135 kg
Colleen Colley	60 kg	1986		160 kg
Colleen Colley	60 kg	1989	Coffee's Gym	175 kg
Colleen Colley	70 kg	1994	Coffee's Gym	165 kg
Amber Davis	53 kg	2004	Team Savannah	152.5 kg
Sarah Davis	53 kg	2009	Team Savannah	154 kg
Sarah Davis	53 kg	2010	Team Savannah	165 kg
Karen Derwin	48 kg	1983		100 kg
Cassidy Duffield	69 kg	2014	Outlaw Barbell	194 kg
Michelle Evris	48 kg	1982		107.5 kg
Michelle Evris	52 kg	1985		145 kg
Michelle Evris	56 kg	1986		162.5 kg
Glenda Ford	67.5 kg	1985		162.5 kg
Glenda Ford	75 kg	1987		167.5 kg
Diana Fuhrman	67.5 kg	1989	Van Nuys	180 kg
Diana Fuhrman	67.5 kg	1991	Van Nuys	197.5 kg
Diana Fuhrman	67.5 kg	1992	Simi Valley, CA	205 kg
Diana Fuhrman	70 kg	1995	Van Nuys	180 kg
Vicki Futch	48 kg	1990	Team Florida	137.5 kg
Vicki Futch	48 kg	1991	Team Florida	137.5 kg
Carla Garrett	+82.5 kg	1991	unattached	215 kg
Carla Garrett	+82.5 kg	1992	Tucson, AZ	220 kg
Carla Garrett	+83 kg	1993	unattached	235 kg
Carla Garrett	+83 kg	1994		220 kg
Ursula Garza	56 kg	1992	Austin, TX	160 kg
Ursula Garza	63 kg	1998	Coffee's Gym	167.5 kg
Teresa Gaume	69 kg	2006	Wesley	199 kg
Melanie Getz	56 kg	1989	Sayre Park	135 kg
Melanie Getz	56 kg	1991	Sayre Park	160 kg
Melanie Getz	54 kg	1994		150 kg
Judy Glenney	67.5 kg	1981		172.5 kg
Judy Glenney	67.5 kg	1982		167.5 kg
Judy Glenney	67.5 kg	1983		167.5 kg
Judy Glenney	67.5 kg	1984		167.5 kg
Carissa Gordon	63 kg	2004	East Coast Gold	202.5 kg
Carissa Gordon	63 kg	2008	East Coast Gold	208 kg
Lorna Griffin	+82.5 kg	1981		167.5 kg
Lorna Griffin	+82.5 kg	1982		175 kg
Lorna Griffin	+82.5 kg	1983		187.5 kg
Gina Guide	48 kg	2009	Windy City Weightlifters	127 kg
Gina Guide	48 kg	2010	Windy City Weightlifters	137 kg
DeAnna Hammock	44 kg	1984		85 kg
DeAnna Hammock	44 kg	1985		90 kg
Kerri Hanebrink	76 kg	1993	Austin CC	180 kg
Kerri Hanebrink	70 kg	1996	Team Savannah	185 kg
Cheryl Haworth	+75 kg	1998	Team Savannah	222.5 kg
Cheryl Haworth	+75 kg	1999	Team Savannah	245 kg
Cheryl Haworth	+75 kg	2000	Team Savannah	260 kg
Cheryl Haworth	+75 kg	2001	Team Savannah	270 kg
Cheryl Haworth	+75 kg	2002	Team Savannah	270 kg
Cheryl Haworth	+75 kg	2003	Team Savannah	270 kg
Cheryl Haworth	+75 kg	2004	Team Savannah	267.5 kg
Cheryl Haworth	+75 kg	2005	Team Savannah	275 kg
Cheryl Haworth	+75 kg	2006	Team Savannah	270 kg
Cheryl Haworth	+75 kg	2007	Unattached	280 kg
Cheryl Haworth	+75 kg	2008	Coastal Empire Weightlifting	232 kg
Sibby Harris	44 kg	1987		105.0 kg
Sibby Harris	44 kg	1988	Coffee's Gym	117.5 kg
Sibby Harris	48 kg	1989	Coffee's Gym	107.5 kg
Sibby Harris	44 kg	1990	Coffee's Gym	127.5 kg
Sibby Harris	44 kg	1992	Carroliton, GA	145.0 kg
Sibby Harris	46 kg	1993	Coffee's Gym	142.5 kg
Sibby Harris	46 kg	1994		140.0 kg
Sibby Harris	46 kg	1995	Coffee's Gym	145.0 kg
Sibby Harris	46 kg	1996	Coffee's Gym	140.0 kg
Cara Heads-Slaughter	70 kg	1997	Team Savannah	182.5 kg
Cara Heads-Slaughter	75 kg	1998	Team Savannah	207.5 kg
Cara Heads-Slaughter	75 kg	2000	Team Savannah	225.0 kg
Cara Heads-Slaughter	69 kg	2002	Team Southern California	212.5 kg
Cara Heads-Slaughter	75 kg	2003	Team Southern California	220.0 kg
Cara Heads-Slaughter	75 kg	2004	Team Southern California	227.5 kg
Cara Heads-Slaughter	75 kg	2005	Team Southern California	212.5 kg
Cara Heads-Slaughter	75 kg	2008	Team Southern California	206.0 kg
Doreen Heldt	75 kg	2002	Team Nebraska	205.0 kg
Doreen Heldt	75 kg	2006	unattached	221.0 kg
Doreen Heldt	75 kg	2007	Front Range Weightlifters	221.0 kg
Miriam Hoffer	44 kg	1983		90.0 kg
Caitlin Hogan	53 kg	2016	Waxman's Gym	182.0 kg
Amanda Hubbard	58 kg	2009	Coffee's Gym	193.0 kg
Amanda Hubbard	58 kg	2010	Coffee's Gym	193.0 kg
Amanda Hubbard	58 kg	2012	Coffee's Gym	197.0 kg
Khadijah Hunter	76 kg	1997	Team Savannah	195.0 kg
Mary Hyder	82.5 kg	1982		140.0 kg
Mary Hyder	82.5 kg	1990		155.0 kg
Mary Hyder	82.5 kg	1992	Dallas, TX	155.0 kg
Jamia Jackson	75 kg	2011	unattached	198.0 kg
Jamia Jackson	75 kg	2012	Twin City Barbell	200.0 kg
Hilary Katzenmier	58 kg	1988	East Coast Gold	170.0 kg
Lauren Kenneally	75 kg	1988	Reno's Weightlifting Club	162.5 kg
Stacey Ketchum	76 kg	1995	Coffee's Gym	195.0 kg
Stacey Ketchum	76 kg	1996	Coffee's Gym	197.5 kg
Stacey Ketchum	75 kg	1999	Coffee's Gym	197.5 kg
Ellen Kercher	48 kg	2012	Team Georgia	138.0 kg
Suzanne Kim	56 kg	1988	La Petite Animiux	137.5 kg
Morghan King	48 kg	2013	Muscle Driver USA	156.0 kg
Morghan King	53 kg	2014	Muscle Driver USA	170.0 kg
Morghan King	48 kg	2016	unattached	180.0 kg
Marissa Klingeis	+75 kg	2016	Wesley Weightlifters	257.0 kg
Arlys Kovach	67.5 kg	1986		172.5 kg
Arlys Kovach	67.5 kg	1987		182.5 kg
Arlys Kovach	67.5 kg	1988	unattached	187.5 kg
Arlys Kovach	75 kg	1989	International Olympic Lifter	202.5 kg
Arlys Kovach	75 kg	1992	Seattle, WA	200.0 kg
Arlys Kovach	70 kg	1993	unattached	185.0 kg
Arlys Kovach	76 kg	1994		197.5 kg
Suzanne Leathers	75 kg	2001	Team Savannah	205.0 kg
Lisa Long	75 kg	1983		150.0 kg
Jessica Lucero	58 kg	2015		198.0 kg
Jessica Lucero	58 kg	2016	Catalyst Athletics	208.0 kg
Kelly Lynch	75 kg	2008	unattached	198.0 kg
Holley Mangold	+75 kg	2014	Columbus Barbell	234.0 kg
Holley Mangold	+75 kg	2015	Muscle Driver USA	248.0 kg
Ingrid Marcum	75 kg	2009	Windy City Weightlifters	194.0 kg
Danelle Markham	52 kg	1986		110.0 kg
Vanessa McCoy	63 kg	2011	Wesley Weightlifters	181.0 kg
Ann McKinnon	75 kg	1985		135.0 kg
Leslie Musser	58 kg	2003	Phat Elvis	160.0 kg
Kathie Nichol	48 kg	1987		75.0 kg
Tara Nott-Cunningham	50 kg	1996	Coffee's Gym	127.5 kg
Tara Nott-Cunningham	50 kg	1997	Coffee's Gym	155.0 kg
Tara Nott-Cunningham	48 kg	1999	Sayre Park	172.5 kg
Tara Nott-Cunningham	48 kg	2000	Sayre Park	177.5 kg
Tara Nott-Cunningham	53 kg	2002	unattached	185.0 kg
Tara Nott-Cunningham	48 kg	2003	Sayre Park	175.0 kg
Tara Nott-Cunningham	48 kg	2004	Windy City Weightlifters	167.5 kg
Jacque Payne	53 kg	2012	Front Range Weightlifters	153.0 kg
Jacque Payne	53 kg	2013	Front Range Weightlifters	164.0 kg
Mary Peck	63 kg	2016	Hassle Free Barbell	208.0 kg
Nikki Peek	58 kg	1998	Team Wesley	132.5 kg
Le Ann Powers	75 kg	1990		147.5 kg
Ashley Perkovich	63 kg	2012	Calpians	192.0 kg
Melanie Pritchard-Roach	54 kg	1997	Calpians	167.5 kg
Melanie Pritchard-Roach	53 kg	1998	Calpians	192.5 kg
Melanie Pritchard-Roach	58 kg	1999	Calpians	192.5 kg
Melanie Pritchard-Roach	58 kg	2000	Calpians	190.0 kg
Melanie Pritchard-Roach	53 kg	2003	Calpians	167.5 kg
Melanie Pritchard-Roach	53 kg	2006	Calpians	175.0 kg
Melanie Pritchard-Roach	53 kg	2007	Calpians	184.0 kg
Melanie Pritchard-Roach	53 kg	2008	Calpians	183.0 kg
Jerri Pugh	48 kg	2005	Team Houston	132.5 kg
Kathy Redcher-Bowling	63 kg	2003	Team Sacramento	167.5 kg
Diane Redgate	60 kg	1982		110.0 kg
Kathy Regan	52 kg	1983		125.0 kg
Lea Rentmeester	64 kg	1994		175.0 kg
Lea Rentmeester	59 kg	1995	Team Savannah	167.5 kg
Lea Rentmeester	64 kg	1996	Team Savannah	192.5 kg
Lea Rentmeester	64 kg	1997	Team Savannah	207.5 kg
Lea Rentmeester	69 kg	1998	Team Savannah	205.0 kg
Lea Rentmeester	69 kg	1999	Team Savannah	215.0 kg
Kelly Rexroad-Williams	50 kg	1995	Coffee's Gym	120.0 kg
Kelly Rexroad-Williams	48 kg	2011	Coffee's Gym	163.0 kg
Kelly Rexroad-Williams	48 kg	2014	Coffee's Gym	154.0 kg
Rhiannon Reynolds	53 kg	2015	Metropolitan Elite	173.0 kg
Rizelyx Riveria	58 kg	2011	East Coast Gold	195.0 kg
Sarah Robles	+75.0 kg	2009	Team Arizona	226.0 kg
Sarah Robles	+75.0 kg	2010	unattached	226.0 kg
Sarah Robles	+75.0 kg	2011	Team Arizona	253.0 kg
Sarah Robles	+75.0 kg	2012	Team Arizona	258.0 kg
Mattie Rogers	69 kg	2015	Team Oly Concepts	218.0 kg
Mattie Rogers	69 kg	2016	Team Oly Concepts	228.0 kg
Danica Rue	63 kg	2000	La Petite Animiux	187.5 kg
Danica Rue	63 kg	2001	La Petite Animiux	192.5 kg
Danica Rue	63 kg	2002	La Petite Animiux	202.5 kg
Danica Rue	69 kg	2003	La Petite Animiux	200.0 kg
Danica Rue	69 kg	2004	La Petite Animiux	197.5 kg
Danica Rue	69 kg	2005	La Petite Animiux	215.0 kg
Danica Rue	69 kg	2010	Metropolitan Elite	206.0 kg
Danica Rue	69 kg	2012	Metropolitan Elite	200.0 kg
Carol Santandrea	44 kg	1986		95.0 kg
Vicki Scaffe	+83 kg	1996	Coffee's Gym	192.5 kg
Vicki Scaffe	83 kg	1997	Coffee's Gym	187.5 kg
Giselle Shepatin	60 kg	1985	The Sports Palace	140.0 kg
Giselle Shepatin	60 kg	1987	The Sports Palace	155.0 kg
Giselle Shepatin	60 kg	1988	The Sports Palace	157.5 kg
Giselle Shepatin	60 kg	1990	The Sports Palace	167.5 kg
Giselle Shepatin	60 kg	1991	The Sports Palace	170.0 kg
Giselle Shepatin	60 kg	1992	The Sports Palace	170.0 kg
Giselle Shepatin	64 kg	1993	The Sports Palace	170.0 kg
Giselle Shepatin	59 kg	1994	The Sports Palace	172.5 kg
Lisa Simm	56 kg	1981		77.5 kg
Rachel Silverman	52 kg	1982	The Sports Palace	117.5 kg
Rachel Silverman	52 kg	1984	The Sports Palace	125.0 kg
Rachel Silverman	48 kg	1985	The Sports Palace	120.0 kg
Rachel Silverman	52 kg	1987	The Sports Palace	125.0 kg
Rachel Silverman	52 kg	1988	The Sports Palace	135.0 kg
Lynne Stoessel	56 kg	1990		155.0 kg
Stacy Suyama	48 kg	2006	unattached	143.0 kg
Stacy Suyama	48 kg	2007	Unatached	160.0 kg
Stacy Suyama	48 kg	2008	Unatached	156.0 kg
Thea Taylor	52 kg	1990		122.5 kg
Andrea Tibeau-Lyons	44 kg	1989	Calpians	107.5 kg
Andrea Tibeau-Lyons	44 kg	1991	Calpians	130.0 kg
Andrea Tibeau-Lyons	46 kg	1997	Calpians	137.5 kg
Misha Utley	48 kg	1992	Lawrenceburg, IN	125.0 kg
Geralee Vega	63 kg	2013	East Coast Gold	216.0 kg
Geralee Vega	63 kg	2014	East Coast Gold	210.0 kg
Geralee Vega	63 kg	2015	East Coast Gold	200.0 kg
Erin Wallace	75 kg	2010	LSU-Shreveport	217.0 kg
Erin Wallace	69 kg	2013	LSU-Shreveport	208.0 kg
Karen Weaver	82.5 kg	1981		85.0 kg
Joette Weber	44 kg	1981		72.5 kg
Jodi Wilhite-Vaughn	53 kg	2005	Coffee's Gym	147.5 kg
Jodi Wilhite-Vaughn	53 kg	2011	Coffee's Gym	152.0 kg
Christina Wilson	59 kg	1996	Northern Arizona University	167.5 kg
Christina Wilson	59 kg	1997	Northern Arizona University	182.5 kg
Kathleen Winters	48 kg	2015	Team Montana	162 kg
Natalie Burgener-Woolfolk	63 kg	2005	East Coast Gold	200 kg
Natalie Burgener-Woolfolk	63 kg	2006	East Coast Gold	212 kg
Natalie Burgener-Woolfolk	63 kg	2007	East Coast Gold	212 kg
Natalie Burgener-Woolfolk	63 kg	2010	Team CrossFit	205 kg
Samantha Zimmerman	75 kg	2013	Gayle Hatch Weightlifters	202 kg
Stephanie Zurek	67.5 kg	1990		152.5 kg

== Multiple champions winning three or more titles ==
As of 29 June 2025

#	Name
11	Cheryl Haworth
10	Robin Byrd-Goad
9	Karyn Bastiansen-Marshall, Sibby Harris-Flowers
8	Cara Heads-Slaughter, Melanie Pritchard-Roach, Danica Rue, Giselle Shepatin
7	Jackie Berube, Arlys Kovach (Johnson), Tara Nott (Cunningham), Sarah Robles, Mattie Rogers
6	Decia Agnew (aka Stenzel), Lea Rentmeester (Foreman)
5	Colleen Colley, Rachel Silverman
4	Jenny Arthur, Carol Cady, Diana Fuhrman, Carla Garrett, Judy Glenney, Jessica Lucero, Natalie Wollfolk (Burgener)
3	Meredith Alwine, Cortney Batchelor, Stephanie Bodie, Loreen Briner (Miller), Mary Beth Cervenak, Michelle Evris, Melanie Getz, Lorna Griffin, Doreen Heldt (Fullhart), Amanda Hubbard (Sandoval), Mary Hyder, Stacey Ketchum, Morghan King, Kelly Rexroad-Williams, Stacy Suyama, Andrea Tibeau (Lyons), Geralee Vega, Mary Theisen-Lappen

== See also ==
- List of United States men's national weightlifting champions
