= Attilio Bescapè =

Italian weightlifter (1910–1975)

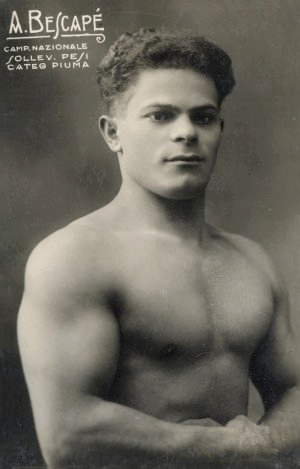

Personal information
- Born: 22 September 1910 Sant'Angelo Lodigiano, Italy
- Died: 3 March 1975 (aged 64)
- Weight: 60 kg (130 lb)

Sport
- Sport: Weightlifting
- Club: Pro Patria 1883, Milan
Medal record
Representing Italy
World Championships
Silver medal – second place	1938 Vienna	-60 kg

Attilio Bescapè (22 September 1910 – 3 March 1975) was an Italian weightlifter. He competed at the 1932 and 1936 Olympics in the featherweight class (−60 kg) and finished in fifth and sixth place, respectively. He won a silver medal at the 1938 World Weightlifting Championships.
