= Karl Schwitalle =

German weightlifter

Personal information
- Full name: Karl Wilhelm Johann Schwitalle
- Nationality: Germany
- Born: 12 April 1906 Breslau, German Empire
- Died: 7 February 1945 (aged 38) Stettin, Nazi Germany

Sport
- Country: Germany
- Sport: Weightlifting
- Weight class: 67.5 kg
- Team: National team
Medal record
Men's Weightlifting
Representing Germany
World Championships
Bronze medal – third place	1938 Vienna	67.5 kg
- Updated on 6 October 2016

Karl Wilhelm Johann Schwitalle (12 April 1906 – 7 February 1945) was a Polish born German male weightlifter, who competed in the lightweight class and represented Germany at international competitions. He won the bronze medal at the 1938 World Weightlifting Championships in the 67.5 kg category. He participated at the 1936 Summer Olympics in the 67.5 kg event finishing fourth.

He was killed in action during World War II.
