= Adolf Wagner (weightlifter) =

German weightlifter (1911–1984)

Olympic medal record

Men's Weightlifting
Bronze medal – third place	1936 Berlin	Men's Middleweight

Adolf Wagner (23 July 1911 – 9 June 1984) was a German weightlifter who competed in the 1936 Summer Olympics and won a bronze medal in the middleweight category. He lifted a total of 352.5 kg (clean and press - 97.5 kg, snatch - 112.5 kg, clean & jerk - 142.5 kg) at bodyweight of 74 kg. He was a member of the club Kraftsportverein Essen 1888. He also won the gold medal in the 1938 World Weightlifting Championships.
