= Fred Lowe =

American weightlifter (born 1947)

Fred Lowe (born 19 November 1947) is an Olympic weightlifter from the United States.

== About ==
Frederick Harland "Fred" Lowe has competed in the sport of weightlifting in several different bodyweight categories and stands 5 feet 2 inches tall. He was born in Toledo, Ohio and grew up in Lambertville, Michigan, a small town in Monroe County just north of the Michigan-Ohio state line.

== Organizations ==
After beginning weightlifting training on 7/08/65, he began competition on 11/20/65 in Marion, Indiana. During his elite competitive years in the senior division, he competed for Chicago's Duncan YMCA and later for York Barbell Club, York.

== Weightlifting achievements ==
- 8th place in the men's Middle Weight in Mexico City (1968)
- 9th place in men's Middleweight in Munich (1972)
- 11th place in men's Middleweight in Montreal (1976)
- Olympic Games team member (1968, 1972, and 1976)
- World Team Member 1969, 1970, 1973, 1981
- Senior National Champion (1969, 1970, 1972, 1973, 1974, 1975, 1976, and 1981)
- Teenage U.S. Records: Press 294 lbs (11/11/67), Snatch 273 lbs (11/11/67), Clean and Jerk 357 lbs (11/11/67), Total 915 lbs (11/11/67)
- U.S. Senior Records: Clean & Jerk 394.5 lbs (2/24/68), 396.75 lbs (6/10/73), 398 lbs (6/6/81), 402.25 lbs (6/6/81), Two-Lift Total: 683.25 lbs (8/31/72), 694.25 lbs (6/10/73)
- First U.S. weightlifter in 75 kg (165 lb) division to clean & jerk over 400 lbs
- First U.S. weightlifter to compete along with his daughter in U.S. Nationals (1997)
- Competed in 16 U.S. National Championships
- Only U.S. weightlifter to qualify for and compete in U.S. Nationals in 6 different decades: 1968, 1969, 1970, 1971, 1972, 1973, 1974, 1975, 1976, 1980, 1981, 1997, 1998, 1999, 2000, 2011
- Has competed in 15 World Masters Championships
- World Masters Champion 9 Times: 1993, 1996, 1997, 1998, 1999, 2000, 2003, 2010, 2011
- Hall of Fame Inductions:

United States Weightlifting Hall of Fame 1989 Greater Toledo Area Weightlifting Hall of Fame 1992 Temperance-Bedford High School Hall of Fame (athlete) 2003 Greater Lansing Area Sports Hall of Fame 2006 United States Masters Weightlifting Hall of Fame 2009 Association of Oldetime Barbell & Strongmen Hall of Fame 2010 Amateur Athletic Union Strength Sports Hall of Fame 2015 World Masters Weightlifting Hall of Fame 2016
