= Fred Marsh (weightlifter) =

British weightlifter

Personal information
- Nationality: British
- Born: 1 May 1910; Leeds, England
- Died: 12 September 1974 (aged 64); Leeds, England

Sport
- Sport: Weightlifting

Fred Marsh (1 May 1910 – 12 September 1974) was a British weightlifter. He competed in the men's featherweight event at the 1936 Summer Olympics.
