= Georg Liebsch =

German weightlifter (1911–1998)

Personal information
- Born: 5 April 1911 Düsseldorf, Germany
- Died: 10 November 1998 (aged 87) Düsseldorf, Germany
- Weight: 59 kg (130 lb)

Sport
- Sport: Weightlifting
- Club: Fortuna Düsseldorf
Medal record
Representing Germany
World Weightlifting Championships
Gold medal – first place	1937 Paris	-60 kg
Gold medal – first place	1938 Vienna	-60 kg

Georg Liebsch (5 April 1911 – 10 November 1998) was a German featherweight weightlifter who won the world title in 1937 and 1938 and placed fifth at the 1936 Summer Olympics. He set two ratified world records in the press, in 1935 and 1937.
