= Frank Spellman =

American weightlifter (1922–2017)

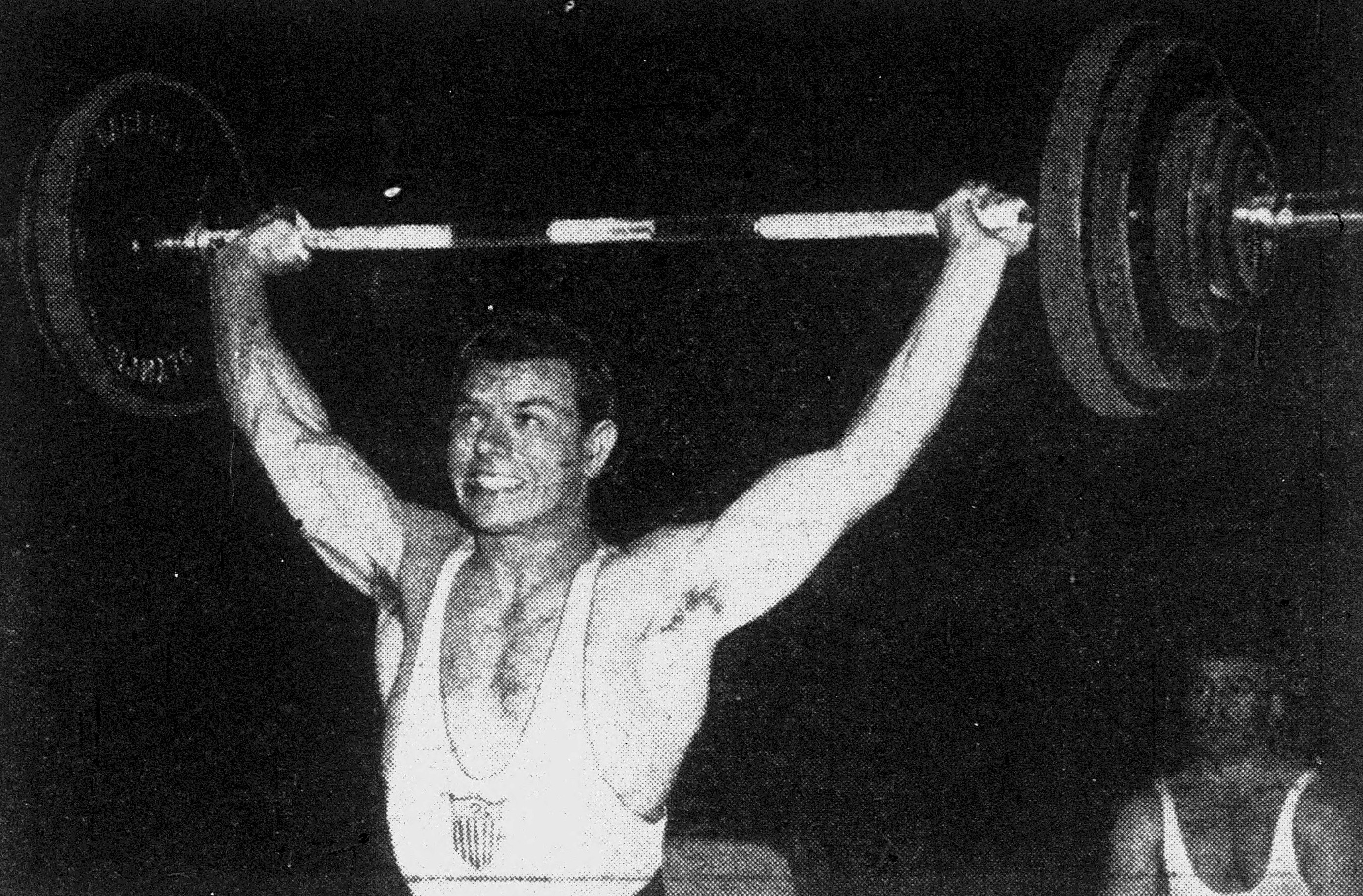
- Spellman, circa 1951

Personal information
- Full name: Frank Isaac Spellman
- Born: September 17, 1922 Malvern, Pennsylvania, U.S.
- Died: January 12, 2017 (aged 94) Gulf Breeze, Florida
- Home town: Philadelphia, Pennsylvania
- Occupation(s): machinist, photographer
- Spouse: Camylle

Sport
- Sport: Weightlifting
- Club: York Barbell Club
Medal record
Representing the United States
Olympic Games
Gold medal – first place	1948 London	-75 kg
World Championships
Bronze medal – third place	1946 Paris	-75 kg
Silver medal – second place	1947 Philadelphia	-75 kg
Maccabiah Games
Gold medal – first place	1950 Israel	middleweight

Frank Isaac Spellman (September 17, 1922 – January 12, 2017) was an American machinist and photographer and a middleweight Olympic champion weightlifter. He won a gold medal at the 1948 Olympics, and a bronze medal and a silver medal at the World Championships in 1946–47. He also won a gold medal at the 1950 Maccabiah Games.

In the US, Spellman won the 1946 and 1948 Amateur Athletic Union (AAU) National titles. He resumed competing in 1961 and won another AAU title that year.

== Early and personal life ==
Spellman was born in Malvern, Pennsylvania, to Sara, an Austrian immigrant and seamstress, and David, a German immigrant and stone quarry foreman who died at forty-eight years of age, and was Jewish. He had four siblings.

From the ages of seven to seventeen, he lived in the Downtown Jewish Orphan Home in Philadelphia; he subsequently lived in South Philadelphia. Beginning a long career in the sport, at the age of twenty, he became a US junior champion in middleweight representing the York Barbell Club.

Drafted in 1942, Spellman served in the United States Army for three years during World War II. In 1944, he fought in the Battle of the Bulge.

After returning from World War II, he lived and was a machinist in York, Pennsylvania. Employed by York Barbell in Pennsylvania, he represented the York Barbell team. In 1952, he moved to Santa Monica, California, where he lived for eighteen years before relocating to Florida.

In addition to weightlifting, Spellman was a professional photographer. He later lived in Gulf Breeze, Florida.

Spellman died on January 12, 2017, at the age of ninety-four at Baptist Hospital in Gold Breeze. He was preceded in death by his wife Camylle Spellman. He had two brothers, Charlie and Harold, two sisters, Ethyl and Frances, and six children: Danny, Kevin, Katie, Yvonne, Larry, and Steve. In addition to photography, he had enjoyed woodworking and playing music as hobbys.

== Weightlifting career ==
In 1942, Spellman won the US middleweight junior title in weightlifting.

Spellman won a bronze medal at the 1946 World Weightlifting Championships. That year he set a new US middleweight record with a press of 257.75 pounds. He also won the US Amateur Athletic Union (AAU) middleweight championship.

He won a silver medal at the 1947 World Weightlifting Championships, and a silver medal at the 1947 US championships

=== Olympic gold medal ===
Spellman won a gold medal at the 1948 Olympics in Men's 75 kg Weightlifting when he was twenty-five years old, setting Olympic middleweight (165 pound) records in the clean & jerk (336.25 pounds) and the total lift (859.5 pounds). That year he set a new US middleweight record with a press of two hundred and sixty pounds. He also won the US AAU middleweight championship.

In 1949 Spellman won the North American middleweight title, and finished second in the United States championships.

Spellman competed at the 1950 Maccabiah Games in Israel, and won a gold medal at middleweight. That year, he set a new American middleweight record with a press of 261.75 pounds.

In 1951 he finished third in the US championships. In 1952, he finished second at lightweight in the US championships.

In 1954, he established a new world record during the American squat championships with a squat lift of five hundred and ten pounds; he weighed one hundred and seventy pounds at the time. Spellman finished second in light-heavyweight during the American championships.

Spellman resumed competing in 1971, at the age of forty-nine, and won his third national AAU middleweight title that year.

== Halls of Fame ==
Spellman was elected to the United States Weightlifting Hall of Fame, the Helms Athletic Foundation Hall of Fame, and the Porterville Quarterback Hall of Fame. Spellman was inducted into the International Jewish Sports Hall of Fame in 1983. In 1990, he was inducted into the Southern California Jewish Sports Hall of Fame. He was then inducted into the Philadelphia Jewish Sports Hall of Fame in its class of 2003/2004. In 2011 he was inducted into the Chester County Sports Hall of Fame.

== See also ==
- List of select Jewish weightlifters
