= Tony Terlazzo =

American weightlifter (1911–1966)

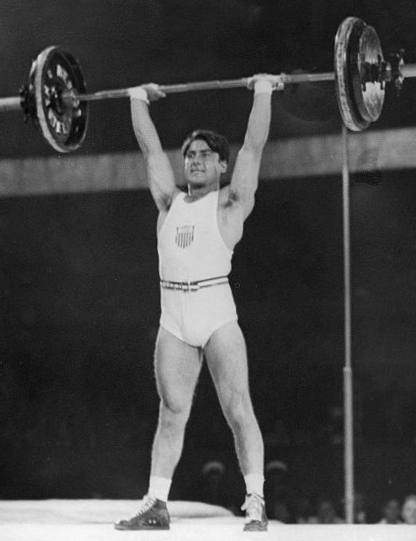
- Terlazzo at the 1936 Olympics

Personal information
- Born: July 28, 1911 Patti, Sicily, Italy
- Died: March 26, 1966 (aged 54) Los Angeles, U.S.

Sport
- Sport: Weightlifting
- Club: YOBAC, York
Medal record
Representing the United States
Olympic Games
Gold medal – first place	1936 Berlin	-60 kg
Bronze medal – third place	1932 Los Angeles	-60 kg
World Championships
Gold medal – first place	1937 Paris	-67.5 kg
Gold medal – first place	1938 Vienna	-67.5 kg

Anthony Terlazzo (July 28, 1911 – March 26, 1966) was an Italian-born American weightlifter. He was America's first weightlifter to win an Olympic gold medal, which he had done in 1936. He also won a bronze medal at the 1932 Games. While winning the 1936 gold medal Terlazzo set Olympic records in the total, at 312.5 kg (687.5 lbs), and in the snatch, at 97.5 kg (214.5 lbs).

Terlazzo won two world (1937–38) and 12 national titles, which remains the highest number for any American weightlifter. Between 1935 and 1938 he set five ratified world records: three in the press and two in the clean and jerk.
