= Weightlifting at the 1936 Summer Olympics – Men's 67.5 kg =

Weightlifting at the Olympics

The men's lightweight event was part of the weightlifting programme at the 1936 Summer Olympics in Berlin. The weight class was the second-lightest contested, and allowed weightlifters of up to 67.5 kilograms (148.8 pounds). The competition was held on Sunday, 2 August 1936. Sixteen weightlifters from twelve nations competed.

== Medalists ==
Gold	Silver	Bronze
Robert Fein; Austria Anwar Mesbah; Egypt		Karl Jansen; Germany

== Records ==
These were the standing world and Olympic records (in kilograms) prior to the 1936 Summer Olympics.

World Record	Press	106	(Austria) Robert Fein	Vienna (AUT)	1936
World Record	Snatch	110	(Austria) Robert Fein	Budapest (HUN)	1936
World Record	Clean & Jerk	141.5	(Egypt) Mohammed Attia	Cairo (EGY)	1935
World Record	Total	335	(Austria) Robert Fein	Warsaw (POL)	1936
Olympic Record	Press	97.5	(France) René Duverger	Los Angeles (USA)	30 July 1932
Olympic Record	Snatch	102.5	(Austria) Hans Haas	Amsterdam (NED)	28 July 1928
Olympic Record	Snatch	102.5	(France) René Duverger	Los Angeles (USA)	30 July 1932
Olympic Record	Clean & Jerk	135	(Austria) Hans Haas	Amsterdam (NED)	28 July 1928
Olympic Record	Clean & Jerk	135	(Germany) Kurt Helbig	Amsterdam (NED)	28 July 1928
Olympic Record	Total	325	(France) René Duverger	Los Angeles (USA)	30 July 1932

Robert Fein set a new Olympic record in press with 105 kilograms. Anwar Mesbah set a new Olympic record in snatch with 105 kilograms. Anwar Mesbah also set a new world record in clean and jerk with 145 kilograms. Robert Fein and Anwar Mesbah both set a new world record in total with 342.5 kilograms.

== Results ==
All figures in kilograms.

Place	Weightlifter	Body weight	Press			Snatch			Clean & jerk			Total
Place	Weightlifter	Body weight	1.	2.	3.	1.	2.	3.	1.	2.	3.	Total
1	Anwar Mesbah (EGY)	66.1	87.5	92.5	-	92.5	100	105	132.5	142.5	145	342.5 WR
1	Robert Fein (AUT)	66.7	97.5	102.5	105	X (100)	100	X (105)	130	135	137.5	342.5 WR
3	Karl Jansen (GER)	66.6	87.5	95	X (97.5)	95	X (100)	100	125	132.5	X (137.5)	327.5
4	Karl Schwitalle (GER)	66.5	90	95	X (97.5)	95	X (100)	100	120	127.5	X (130)	322.5
5	John Terpak (USA)	67.0	92.5	97.5	X (100)	95	100	-	X (125)	125	X (132.5)	322.5
6	El-Sayed Ibrahim Masoud (EGY)	67.4	85	90	X (92.5)	100	X (105)	X (105)	125	130	132.5	322.5
7	René Duverger (FRA)	66.6	90	95	97.5	X (95)	95	X (100)	X (120)	120	125	317.5
8	Robert Mitchell (USA)	59.0	85	X (90)	X (90)	97.5	X (105)	X (105)	120	X (130)	130	312.5
9	Rudolf Troppert (AUT)	67.3	77.5	82.5	X (85)	X (95)	95	X (100)	125	X (130)	X (130)	302.5
10	Gastone Pierini (ITA)	66.8	87.5	92.5	95	X (87.5)	87.5	90	115	X (120)	X (120)	300
11	Peeter Mürk (EST)	66.8	70	75	X (77.5)	90	X (95)	95	115	X (120)	X (120)	285
12	Jens Björklund (SWE)	67.0	82.5	X (87.5)	X (87.5)	X (85)	X (85)	85	110	115	X (120)	282.5
13	Antonín Balda (TCH)	67.0	80	X (85)	X (85)	X (90)	90	X (95)	X (110)	X (110)	110	280
14	Henri Blanc (SUI)	67.4	75	X (82.5)	82.5	80	X (90)	X (90)	110	115	X (120)	277.5
15	Alfred Griffin (GBR)	64.0	X (82.5)	82.5	87.5	X (80)	80	82.5	X (105)	X (105)	105	275
16	Own Kongding (ROC)	66.7	72.5	77.5	X (80)	75	X (85)	X (85)	X (100)	X (100)	X (100)	152.5

The bodyweight for all weightlifters is given as before the competition. An Austrian protest was upheld to reweigh the medalists after the event, when both Fein and Mesbah had the same bodyweight, both were awarded gold medals.

== Sources ==
- Olympic Report
- Wudarski, Pawel (1999). "Wyniki Igrzysk Olimpijskich" (in Polish).
