= Deaths in September 1999 =

The following is a list of notable deaths in September 1999.

Entries for each day are listed alphabetically by surname. A typical entry lists information in the following sequence:

- Name, age, country of citizenship at birth, subsequent country of citizenship (if applicable), reason for notability, cause of death (if known), and reference.

== September 1999 ==
=== 1 ===
- Hubert Bobo, 65, American gridiron football player (Los Angeles Chargers, New York Titans).
- Doc Marshall, 93, American baseball player (New York Giants).
- Boots Poffenberger, 84, American Major League Baseball player (Detroit Tigers, Brooklyn Dodgers).
- S. Srinivasan, 58, Indian aeronautical engineer.
- W. Richard Stevens, 48, American author of computer science books.
- Doreen Valiente, 77, English wiccan, pancreatic cancer.
- Stanley Alexander Weigel, 93, American district judge (United States District Court for the Northern District of California).
- Edward Żuławnik, 66, Polish Olympic wrestler (1960).

=== 2 ===
- Romolo Carboni, 88, Italian prelate of the Catholic Church.
- Virginia Gutiérrez de Pineda, 77, Colombian anthropologist.
- Margherita Guarducci, 96, Italian archaeologist, classical scholar, and epigrapher.
- Philip Francis Murphy, 66, American clergyman of the Roman Catholic Church, cancer.
- Lajos Szűcs, 53, Hungarian Olympic weightlifter (1972, 1976).

=== 3 ===
- Frans Cools, 81, Belgian Olympic cyclist (1936).
- Paul Lucien Dessau, 89, British painter.
- Fred Gardner, 89, Australian rugby league footballer.
- Abdul Cader Shahul Hameed, 72, Sri Lankan diplomat and political figure.
- George Hunt, 83, American rower and Olympic gold medalist (1936).
- Franz Pleyer, 88, Austrian-French football player.
- Hugh Wiley, 72, American equestrian and Olympian (1956, 1960).

=== 4 ===
- Emilio Aldecoa, 76, Spanish football player.
- Charlie Depthios, 59, Indonesian Olympic weightlifter (1968, 1972).
- Georg Gawliczek, 80, German football manager and player.
- Erma Keyes, 73, American baseball player.
- Charles Lee, 75, English cricket player.
- Orlando Lelé, 50, Brazilian footballer.
- Shlomo Morag, 73, Israeli professor of Hebrew.
- Orlando Pereira, 50, Brazilian football player and manager.
- Klement Slavický, 88, Czech composer of modern classical music.
- Lucjan Sosnowski, 65, Polish Olympic wrestler (1960, 1964).

=== 5 ===
- Alan Clark, 71, British Conservative politician, Member of Parliament (1974–1999), and military historian, brain cancer.
- Allen Funt, 84, American television personality (Candid Camera), stroke.
- William Keith, 73, South African Olympic long distance runner (1952).
- Bryce Mackasey, 78, Canadian politician and ambassador to Portugal.
- Charles Onyeama, 82, Nigerian jurist and judge.
- Walther Reyer, 77, Austrian actor.
- Ivor Roberts, 74, British actor and a television continuity announcer.
- Leonid Sedov, 91, Soviet and Russian mathematician.
- Geraldo de Proença Sigaud, 89, Brazilian prelate of the Roman Catholic Church.
- Katie Webster, 63, American boogie-woogie pianist, heart failure.

=== 6 ===
- Arnold Fishkind, 80, American jazz bassist.
- René Lecavalier, 81, Canadian French-language radio show host and sportscaster.
- Steve Little, 43, American football player (St. Louis Cardinals).
- Tamás Mendelényi, 63, Hungarian fencer and Olympic champion (1960).

=== 7 ===
- Thierry Claveyrolat, 40, French road bicycle racer, suicide by gunshot.
- Hugo del Vecchio, 71, Argentine Olympic basketball player (1952).
- Ian Doyle, 67, Australian rugby league footballer.
- Bjarne Iversen, 86, Norwegian cross-country skier and Olympian (1936).
- Robert Simon, 49, American outlaw biker and convicted murderer, beaten.
- Rubén Soberón, 90, Guatemalan Olympic fencer (1952).
- E.G. van de Stadt, 89, Dutch yacht designer.

=== 8 ===
- Birgit Cullberg, 91, Swedish choreographer.
- Mark Gardner, 43, American convicted murderer, execution by lethal injection.
- Lagumot Harris, 60, President of the Republic of Nauru.
- Brian Hildebrand, 37, American professional wrestler, wrestling manager and referee, stomach and bowel cancer.
- Moondog, 83, American musician, composer, theoretician and poet, heart failure.
- Lev Razgon, 91, Soviet and Russian journalist, writer and human rights activist.
- Vladimir Samoylov, 75, Soviet and Russian film and theater actor.
- Herbert Stein, 83, American economist.
- Alan Willett, 52, American convicted murderer, execution by lethal injection.

=== 9 ===
- Abdel Latif Boghdadi, 81, Egyptian politician, air force officer and judge, cancer.
- Chili Bouchier, 89, English film actress.
- Jogesh Das, 72, Indian short-story writer and novelist.
- Arie de Vroet, 80, Dutch football player, manager, and Olympian (1948).
- Tony Duquette, 85, American artist, Parkinson's disease.
- Catfish Hunter, 53, American Hall of Fame baseball player (Kansas City/Oakland Athletics, New York Yankees), ALS.
- Mahmoud Karim, 83, Egyptian squash player.
- Marco Papa, 41, Italian motorcycle racer, traffic collision.
- Chan Parker, 74, American writer and wife of jazz musician Charlie Parker.
- Ruth Roman, 76, American actress.
- Fons van der Stee, 71, Dutch politician.

=== 10 ===
- Gabrielle Bertrand, 76, Canadian politician, member of the House of Commons of Canada (1984-1993).
- Simonne Caillère, 94, French mineralogist and geologist.
- Michèle Fabien, 54, Belgian writer and playwright, cerebral hemorrhage.
- Beau Jocque, 45, Louisiana French Creole zydeco musician and songwriter, heart failure.
- Alfredo Kraus, 71, Spanish tenor.
- Jean Messagier, 79, French painter, sculptor, printmaker and poet.
- M. C. Richards, 83, American poet, potter, and writer.
- Margaret Stuart, 65, New Zealand sprinter and Olympian (1956).
- Vladimir Ulanov, 48, Soviet Russian volleyball player and Olympian (1976).
- Cleveland Williams, 66, American heavyweight boxer, traffic collision.

=== 11 ===
- Mohammed Aly Fahmy, 78, Egyptian field marshal.
- Belkis Ayón, 32, Cuban printmaker, suicide by gunshot.
- Gonzalo Rodríguez Bongoll, 28, Uruguayan racing driver, racing accident.
- Ray Cazaux, 82, English wrestler and Olympian (1936, 1948).
- Johny Jaminet, 69, Luxembourgish Olympic football player (1952).
- David Karp, 77, American novelist and television writer, pulmonary emphysema.
- Bobby Limb, 74, Australian entertainer and radio personality, cancer.
- Francisco José Pérez, 79, Spanish-Cuban chess player.
- Jacob Rabinow, 89, Engineer and inventor.
- Janet Adam Smith, 93, Scottish writer, editor and literary journalist.
- Momčilo Đujić, 92, Serbian Orthodox priest and Chetnik commander during World War II.

=== 12 ===
- Alfred Leo Abramowicz, 80, American prelate in the Roman Catholic Church.
- Laurette Luez, 71, American actress and model.
- Bill Quackenbush, 77, Canadian ice hockey player (Detroit Red Wings, Boston Bruins), pneumonia.
- Allen Stack, 71, American swimmer and Olympic champion (1948, 1952).

=== 13 ===
- Goro Adachi, 86, Japanese Olympic ski jumper (1932, 1936).
- Roland Blanche, 55, French actor, heart attack.
- Benjamin Bloom, 86, American educational psychologist.
- Harry Crane, 85, American comedy writer.
- Miriam Davenport, 84, American painter and sculptor, cancer.
- Erik Diesen, 76, Norwegian revue writer and radio and television personality.
- Don Hamilton, 69, American sports shooter (1968).
- Bill Lohrman, 86, American baseball player.
- George Morris, 80, American football player (Cleveland Rams).
- Vladimir Pogačić, 79, Yugoslav film director.
- Ragnar Rygel, 69, Norwegian ice hockey player and Olympian (1952).

=== 14 ===
- Joel Beck, 56, American artist and cartoonist, complications from alcoholism.
- Jehan Buhan, 87, French fencer, Olympic champion (1948, 1952).
- Charles Crichton, 89, English film and television director (A Fish Called Wanda, The Lavender Hill Mob, Space: 1999).
- Miguel Angel Cuello, 53, Argentinian boxer and Olympian (1972).
- Chuck Higgins, 75, American saxophonist, lung cancer.
- Giannos Kranidiotis, 51, Greek diplomat and politician, twice Deputy Foreign Minister of Greece, aviation accident.
- Ian Wahn, 83, Canadian politician, member of the House of Commons of Canada (1962-1972).

=== 15 ===
- Larry Gene Ashbrook, 47, American mass murderer (Wedgwood Baptist Church shooting), suicide by gunshot.
- Stewart Bovell, 92, Australian politician.
- Renato Constantino, 80, Filipino historian.
- Lila Leeds, 71, American film actress, heart attack.
- Michel Pinseau, 73, French architect.
- Jack Hardiman Scott, 79, British journalist and broadcaster.
- Petr Shelokhonov, 70, Russian actor, director, filmmaker and socialite.
- Kiichiro Toyama, 89, Japanese Olympic gymnast (1936).
- Bill Westwood, 73, British Anglican bishop.
- Abdolhossein Zarrinkoob, 76, Iranian scholar.

=== 16 ===
- W. Arthur Garrity Jr., 79, American district judge (United States District Court for the District of Massachusetts).
- Paul Gregory, 91, American baseball player (Chicago White Sox).
- Viktar Hanchar, 42, Belarusian politician, kidnapped and murdered by the Lukashenko regime.
- Doug Hansen, 70, American baseball player (Cleveland Indians).
- Endre Rozsda, 85, Hungarian-French painter.
- Utaemon Ichikawa, 92, Japanese film actor.
- Ace Williams, 82, American baseball player (Boston Bees/Braves).

=== 17 ===
- Leonard Carlitz, 91, American mathematician.
- Riccardo Cucciolla, 75, Italian actor and voice actor.
- Rajeshwar Dayal, 90, Indian diplomat and writer, stroke.
- Liane Collot d’Herbois, 91, British painter and painting therapist.
- Ellen Frank, 95, German film and television actress.
- Joan Gardner, 84, British actress.
- Hasrat Jaipuri, 77, Indian poet.
- Harold Johnson, 79, American basketball player.
- Gary Koshnitsky, 91, Australian chess master.
- François Müller, 72, Luxembourgish football player and Olympian (1952).
- Udo Springsklee, 60, German Olympic sailor (1968).
- Henri Storck, 92, Belgian author, filmmaker and documentarist.
- Rathvon M. Tompkins, 87, United States Marine Corps major general, stroke.
- Frankie Vaughan, 71, British singer, heart failure.

=== 18 ===
- Leo Amberg, 87, Swiss professional road bicycle racer.
- Samuel James Ervin III, 73, American circuit judge (United States Court of Appeals for the Fourth Circuit).
- Edna Gross, 88, British Olympic gymnast (1936).
- József Gyönyörű, 74, Hungarian Olympic sports shooter (1960).
- Philip N. Krasne, 94, American motion picture and television producer.
- Harold F. Kress, 86, American film editor.
- Gérard Landry, Argentinian actor.
- Noel Pope, 91, New Zealand rower and Olympian (1932).
- Viktor Safronov, 81, Soviet astronomer.
- Nic Scheitler, 89, Luxembourgian Olympic weightlifter (1928, 1936).
- Leo Valiani, 90, Italian historian, politician and journalist.
- Leszek Wodzyński, 53, Polish hurdler and Olympian (1972).

=== 19 ===
- Ed Cobb, 61, American musician, songwriter, and record producer, leukemia.
- Livio Isotti, 72, Italian road bicycle racer and Olympian (1948).
- Pavle Ivić, 74, Serbian Slavic dialectologist and phonologist.
- Bua Kitiyakara, 89, Thai actress and wife of prince Nakkhatra Mangala.
- Kjell Kristiansen, 74, Norwegian football player and Olympian (1952).
- Tim Lawry, 88, American basketball player.

=== 20 ===
- Erland Almqvist, 87, Swedish sailor and Olympic silver medalist (1952).
- Raisa Gorbacheva, 67, Russian activist, leukemia.
- Taheyya Kariokka, 84, Egyptian belly dancer and film actress, pneumonia.
- Robert Lebel, 93, Canadian ice hockey administrator.
- Karl Heinrich Menges, 91, German linguist.
- Willy Millowitsch, 90, German actor and director, heart failure.
- T. R. Rajakumari, 77, Indian film actress, singer and dancer.

=== 21 ===
- Georgia Louise Harris Brown, 81, American architect.
- Juan Carlos Colmán, 76, Argentine footballer.
- Robert Galbraith Heath, 84, American psychiatrist.
- Benny Kalama, 83, American singer and arranger.
- Mária Saáry, 71, Hungarian Olympic figure skater (1948).
- Sander Thoenes, 30, Dutch journalist, shot in East Timor.

=== 22 ===
- Doris Allen, 63, American politician, colorectal cancer.
- Noriko Awaya, 92, Japanese soprano chanteuse and ryūkōka singer.
- René Geeraert, 90, Belgian Olympic middle-distance runner (1936).
- Clive Jenkins, 73, British trade union leader.
- Tomoo Kudaka, 36, Japanese football player, stomach cancer.
- Paul Magès, 91, French inventor.
- Jeanine Rueff, 77, French composer and music educator.
- Sal Salvador, 73, American bebop jazz guitarist.
- George C. Scott, 71, American actor (Patton, Dr. Strangelove, The Hustler), Oscar winner (1971), abdominal aortic aneurysm.
- Chester Starr, 84, American historian.
- Vasili Trofimov, 80, Soviet football player and Olympian (1952).

=== 23 ===
- Jean Castel, 83, French Olympic sailor (1948).
- Alise Dzeguze, 85, Latvian Olympic figure skater (1936).
- Ivan Goff, 89, Australian screenwriter, Alzheimer's disease.
- Sir Piers Jacob, 63, Financial Secretary of Hong Kong (1986 – 1991).
- Ri Jong-ok, 83, Premier of North Korea ( 1977 – 1984).
- Hermann Monter, 72, German footballer.
- Leland Chris Nielsen, 80, American district judge (United States District Court for the Southern District of California).
- Cristiano Rodeghiero, 84, Italian Olympic cross-country skier (1948).
- Werner Vycichl, 90, Austro-Hungarian philologist, linguist, and academic.

=== 24 ===
- Robert Bend, 85, Canadian politician.
- Ester Boserup, 89, Danish and French economist.
- Rowena Mary Bruce, 80, English chess player.
- Judith Exner, 65, American socialite and mistress of John F. Kennedy, breast cancer.
- Jack Kiefer, 59, American golfer, cancer.
- Anneli Cahn Lax, 77, American mathematician.
- Tarmo Manni, 78, Finnish actor.
- Billy Pricer, 65, American gridiron football player.

=== 25 ===
- Marion Zimmer Bradley, 69, American author of fantasy and science fiction, heart attack.
- Julio Cernuda, 79, Argentine Olympic alpine skier (1948).
- Teodor Kocerka, 72, Polish rower and Olympic medalist (1952, 1956, 1960).
- Des O'Neil, 78, Australian politician, Deputy Premier of Western Australia. (1975 – 1980).
- Guido Pontecorvo, 91, Italian-Scottish geneticist.
- Anna Shchetinina, 91, Soviet merchant marine sailor.
- Ding Sheng, 85, Chinese general and politician.

=== 26 ===
- Enzo Carli, 89, Italian art historian and art critic.
- Jesse Dirkhising, 13, American teenager, drugging and positional asphyxia.
- Malky McDonald, 85, Scottish football player and manager.
- Bernadette O'Farrell, 75, Irish actress.
- Donald Sanders, 69, American lawyer and a key figure in the Watergate investigation, cancer.

=== 27 ===
- Philip Haddon-Cave, 74, British colonial administrator, heart attack.
- Herbert Heilpern, 80, Austrian-American association football executive.
- Warren Montabone, 96, Canadian Olympic hurdler (1924, 1928).
- Billy Mould, 79, English footballer.
- Monique Rolland, 85, French film actress.
- Krishna Pal Singh, 77, Indian activist and politician.
- Grant Warwick, 77, Canadian professional ice hockey player (New York Rangers, Boston Bruins, Montreal Canadiens).

=== 28 ===
- Franco Caracciolo, 79, Italian conductor.
- Edwin Dimes, 95, American baseball player.
- Marek Galiński, 48, Polish Olympic wrestler (1980).
- Arumugam Ponnu Rajah, 88, Singaporean judge, diplomat and politician.
- Escott Reid, 94, Canadian diplomat.
- Marilyn Silverstone, 70, English photojournalist and ordained buddhist nun, cancer.

=== 29 ===
- Arnold Earley, 66, American baseball player (Boston Red Sox, Chicago Cubs, Houston Astros).
- Spencer Grace, 92, Australian Olympic rower (1948).
- Walter Joyce, 62, English football player and manager.
- Andriy Khomyn, 31, Ukrainian footballer.
- Gé Korsten, 71, South African opera tenor and actor, suicide by gunshot.
- Yevhen Lapinsky, 57, Soviet Ukrainian volleyball player and Olympic champion (1968, 1972).
- Gustavo Leigh, 79, Chilean general, cardiovascular ailments.
- Jean-Louis Millette, 64, Canadian French-speaking actor and writer.
- Edward William O'Rourke, 81, American Roman Catholic bishop.
- Armando Velasco, 81, Ecuadorian-Mexican actor.

=== 30 ===
- Avni Akyol, 68, Turkish politician, heart attack.
- Nikolay Annenkov, 100, Soviet and Russian actor.
- Edward C. Banfield, 82, American political scientist.
- Oswaldo Baliza, 75, Brazilian footballer.
- Tommy Gale, 65, American NASCAR race car driver.
- Thomas Holland, 91, English prelate of the Catholic Church.
- Bruce K. Holloway, 87, American Air Force general, heart failure.
- Dmitry Likhachov, 92, Russian medievalist, linguist and concentration camp survivor.
- John Merriman, 63, British long-distance runner and Olympian (1960).
- Bernard Thomas Moynahan Jr., 80, American district judge (United States District Court for the Eastern District of Kentucky).
- Ray Powell, 73, Canadian ice hockey player (Chicago Black Hawks).
- Sydney Sturgess, 84, British-Canadian actress.
- Anna Mae Winburn, 86, American vocalist and jazz bandleader.
