= Weightlifting at the 1936 Summer Olympics – Men's 82.5 kg =

Men's 82.5 kg at the Games of the XI Olympiad
- Venue: Deutschlandhalle
- Date: 3 August 1936
- Competitors: 14 from 9 nations
- Winning total: 372.5 kg

Medalists
1st place, gold medalist(s)		Louis Hostin	France
2nd place, silver medalist(s)		Eugen Deutsch	Germany
3rd place, bronze medalist(s)		Ibrahim Wasif	Egypt

The men's light heavyweight event was part of the weightlifting programme at the 1936 Summer Olympics in Berlin. The weight class was the second-heaviest contested, and allowed weightlifters of up to 82.5 kilograms. The competition was held on Monday, 3 August 1936.

== Results ==
All figures in kilograms.

Rank	Weightlifter	Nation	Press				Snatch				Clean & jerk				Total
Rank	Weightlifter	Nation	1	2	3	Result	1	2	3	Result	1	2	3	Result	Total
1st place, gold medalist(s)	Louis Hostin	France	102.5	107.5	110.0	110.0 OR	110.0	115.0	117.5	117.5 OR	140.0	145.0	~~152.5~~	145.0	372.5 OR
2nd place, silver medalist(s)	Eugen Deutsch	Germany	97.5	102.5	105.0	105.0	~~110.0~~	110.0	~~112.5~~	110.0	142.5	147.5	150.0	150.0 =OR	365.0
3rd place, bronze medalist(s)	Ibrahim Wasif	Egypt	95.0	100.0	~~102.5~~	100.0	102.5	107.5	110.0	110.0	142.5	147.5	150.0	150.0 =OR	360.0
4	Helmut Opschruf	Germany	92.5	97.5	~~100.0~~	97.5	105.0	110.0	~~115.0~~	110.0	140.0	~~147.5~~	147.5	147.5	355.0
5	Nic Scheitler	Luxembourg	100.0	105.0	~~107.5~~	105.0	~~105.0~~	105.0	~~110.0~~	105.0	135.0	140.0	~~150.0~~	140.0	350.0
6	Fritz Haller	Austria	97.5	~~102.5~~	~~102.5~~	97.5	110.0	~~115.0~~	~~115.0~~	110.0	~~142.5~~	142.5	~~152.5~~	142.5	350.0
7	Bill Good	United States	100.0	~~105.0~~	~~105.0~~	100.0	~~105.0~~	105.0	~~112.5~~	105.0	140.0	145.0	~~150.0~~	145.0	350.0
8	Mohamed Geisa	Egypt	95.0	~~100.0~~	~~100.0~~	95.0	102.5	107.5	110.0	110.0	142.5	~~147.5~~	~~147.5~~	142.5	347.5
9	John Miller	United States	97.5	~~102.5~~	~~102.5~~	97.5	102.5	~~107.5~~	107.5	107.5	137.5	~~142.5~~	142.5	142.5	347.5
10	Johann von Szabados	Austria	97.5	102.5	~~105.0~~	102.5	97.5	~~102.5~~	102.5	102.5	132.5	137.5	~~142.5~~	137.5	342.5
11	Gaston le Pût	France	92.5	97.5	100.0	100.0	~~100.0~~	100.0	~~105.0~~	100.0	125.0	130.0	135.0	135.0	335.0
12	Josef Brumlík	Czechoslovakia	97.5	~~102.5~~	102.5	102.5	95.0	~~100.0~~	~~100.0~~	95.0	122.5	127.5	~~132.5~~	127.5	325.0
13	Pierre Cottier	Switzerland	77.5	82.5	85.0	85.0	100.0	100.0	~~102.5~~	100.0	135.0	~~142.5~~	~~142.5~~	135.0	320.0
14	Karl Oole	Estonia	87.5	~~92.5~~	~~92.5~~	87.5	~~100.0~~	~~100.0~~	100.0	100.0	132.5	~~140.0~~	~~140.0~~	132.5	320.0

== Sources ==
- Olympic Report
