= Weightlifting at the 1932 Summer Olympics – Men's 67.5 kg =

Weightlifting at the Olympics

The men's lightweight event was part of the weightlifting programme at the 1932 Summer Olympics in Los Angeles. The weight class was the second-lightest contested, and allowed weightlifters of up to 67.5 kilograms (148.8 pounds). The competition was held on Saturday, 30 July 1932. Six weightlifters from four nations competed.

== Medalists ==
Gold	Silver	Bronze
René Duverger; France	Hans Haas; Austria	Gastone Pierini; Italy

== Records ==
These were the standing world and Olympic records (in kilograms) prior to the 1932 Summer Olympics.

World Record	Press	101	(Egypt) Khalil Yussef	Cairo (EGY)	1931
World Record	Snatch	105.5	(Austria) Robert Fein	Vienna (AUT)	1931
World Record	Clean & Jerk		?		
World Record	Total	330	(Germany) Kurt Helbig	Koblenz (GER)	1928
Olympic Record	Press	90	(Germany) Kurt Helbig	Amsterdam (NED)	28 July 1928
Olympic Record	Press	90	(France) Jules Meese	Amsterdam (NED)	28 July 1928
Olympic Record	Press	90	(Italy) Gastone Pierini	Amsterdam (NED)	28 July 1928
Olympic Record	Press	90	(Germany) Willi Reinfrank	Amsterdam (NED)	28 July 1928
Olympic Record	Snatch	102.5	(Austria) Hans Haas	Amsterdam (NED)	28 July 1928
Olympic Record	Clean & Jerk	135	(Austria) Hans Haas	Amsterdam (NED)	28 July 1928
Olympic Record	Clean & Jerk	135	(Germany) Kurt Helbig	Amsterdam (NED)	28 July 1928
Olympic Record	Total	322.5	(Austria) Hans Haas	Amsterdam (NED)	28 July 1928
Olympic Record	Total	322.5	(Germany) Kurt Helbig	Amsterdam (NED)	28 July 1928

René Duverger set a new Olympic record in press with 97.5 kilograms and in total with 325 kilograms.

== Results ==
All figures in kilograms.

Place	Weightlifter	Press			Snatch			Clean & jerk			Total
Place	Weightlifter	1.	2.	3.	1.	2.	3.	1.	2.	3.	Total
1	René Duverger (FRA)	90	95	97.5	95	100	102.5	120	125	X (130)	325
2	Hans Haas (AUT)	77.5	82.5	X (85)	95	100	X (102.5)	125	X (130)	X (130)	307.5
3	Gastone Pierini (ITA)	87.5	92.5	X (95)	85	90	X (92.5)	115	120	X (122.5)	302.5
4	Pierino Gabetti (ITA)	77.5	82.5	85	90	X (95)	95	X (120)	X (120)	120	300
5	Arnie Sundberg (USA)	72.5	X (77.5)	77.5	85	90	X (92.5)	112.5	117.5	X (122.5)	285
6	Walter Zagurski (USA)	77.5	X (82.5)	82.5	X (85)	85	90	112.5	X (117.5)	X (117.5)	285

== Sources ==
- Olympic Report
- Wudarski, Pawel (1999). "Wyniki Igrzysk Olimpijskich" (in Polish).
