= Sport in the Arab World =

The Arab States have tried to form unions of several non-political organizations. Sport has been one of the main activities used to unify Arabs. Several tournaments and games were created to let Arab participate in sports, in an effort to bring the members of the Arab world closer to each other. Pan-Arab sporting governing bodies include the Union of Arab National Olympic Committees, Arab Athletics Federation, Arab Swimming Confederation, Arab Basketball Confederation, Arab Handball Federation, Arab Rugby Federation, Arab Volleyball Association, Arab Ice Hockey Federation and the GCC Ice Hockey Federation.

== Pan Arab Games ==
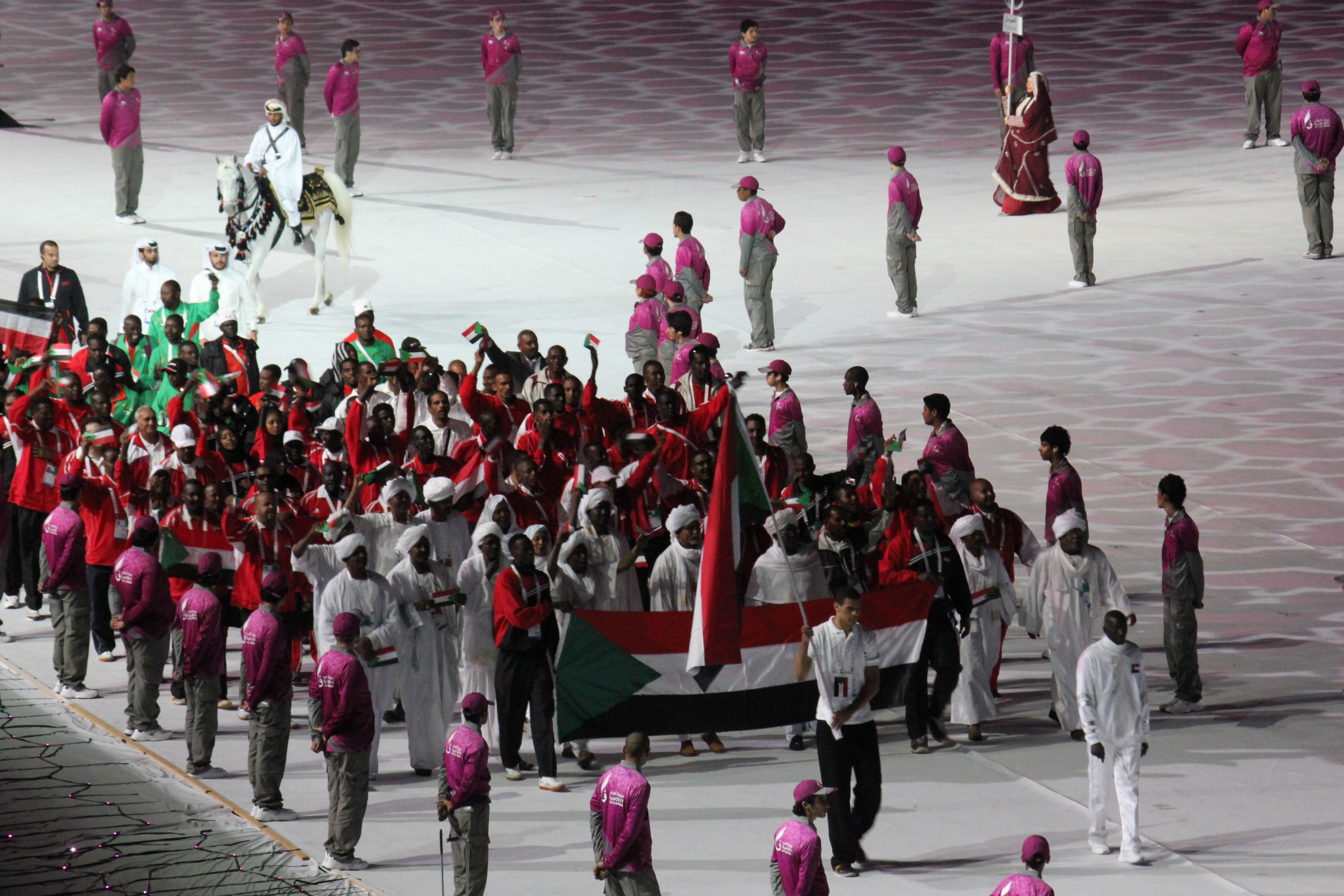
Sudanese delegation at the 2011 Arab Games

The Pan Arab Games were created in 1953 with a grand opening in Alexandria, which hosted the first Games; the games were supposed to take place every four years, like the Olympic Games. Several political problems have made this difficult. The Games included most of the same events as the Olympics. Egypt, with 1,451 medals over the years, is the leader in medal wins, followed by Algeria with 1,134 medals, then Tunisia with 911 medals. Comoros is the only Arab country that has never won a medal at the games.

== Arab Olympic Achievements ==
In nearly 100 years of Arab participation at the Olympic Games, the combined tally of medals won by all Arab countries is 149. In the 21st century, Arab nations constitute almost 11 per cent of the total number of participating nations (204), and have won an average of 11 medals every edition since the turn of the century. Combined, they have achieved their greatest feat at the 2020 Summer Olympics in Tokyo, winning 18 of the 1,080 total medals whilst achieving the most combined gold medals at the 2024 Summer Olympics in Paris, with a total of 7 gold medals won.

=== Egypt ===
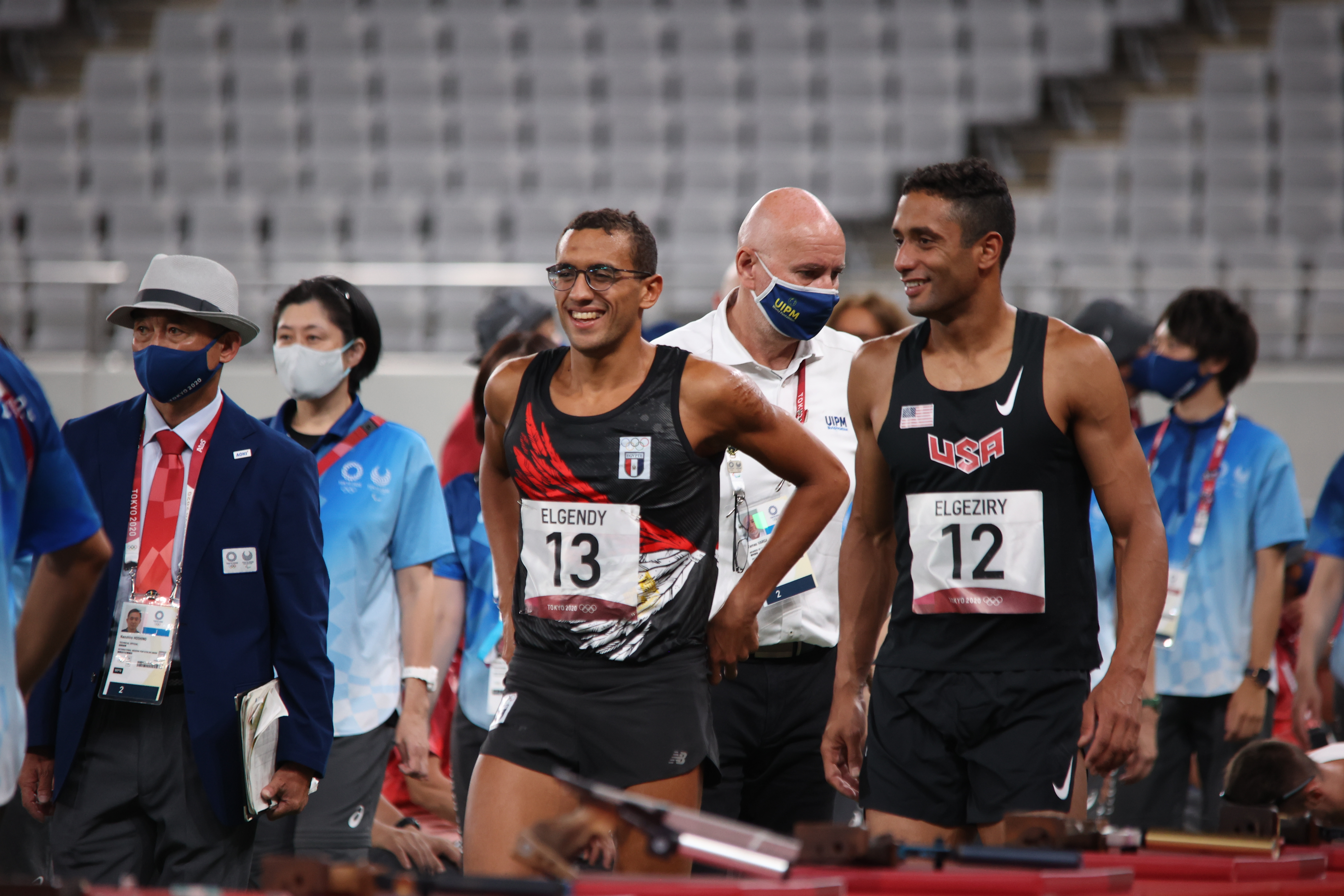
Pentathlete, Ahmed El-Gendy at the 2020 Summer Olympics

Though the modern version of the Olympic games began in 1896, it was not until 1912 that Arabs appeared on the international sporting scene. Egypt became the first Arab country to send an Olympic delegation - fencer Ahmed Hassanein - to the 1912 Summer Olympics in Stockholm. Sixteen years later, Egypt won its first two gold medals, in weightlifting and wrestling, and a silver and bronze in diving at the 1928 Summer Olympics in Amsterdam. Since then it has maintained its competitive edge over other Arab countries and leads the Olympic chart among Arab nations with a total of 41 medals.

In the 2024 Summer Olympics in Paris, Egypt sent the largest ever Arab delegation of 148 athletes competing in archery, artistic swimming, athletics, boxing, canoeing, cycling, diving, equestrian, fencing, football, gymnastics, handball, judo, modern pentathlon, rowing, sailing, shooting, swimming, table tennis, taekwondo, tennis, volleyball, weightlifting and wrestling.

=== Morocco ===
The 1984 Summer Olympics in Los Angeles marked a watershed moment for Arab athletics when Morocco's Nawal El Moutawakel became the first Arab woman to win a gold medal, participating in the 400m hurdles.

Fellow countryman Saïd Aouita also brought home the gold in the 5000m men's marathon. Moroccan talent continued to emerge as Hicham El Guerrouj returned from the 2004 Athens Olympics with two gold medals in the 1500m and 5000m races. Morocco is second to Egypt with 26 Olympic medals.

Summary

Medal	Name	Games	Country	Sport	Event
Gold	El-Sayed Nosseir	1928 Amsterdam	Egypt	Weightlifting	Men's light heavyweight
Gold	Ibrahim Moustafa	1928 Amsterdam	Egypt	Wrestling	Men's Greco-Roman light heavyweight
Silver	Farid Simaika	1928 Amsterdam	Egypt	Diving	Men's 10 m platform
Bronze	Farid Simaika	1928 Amsterdam	Egypt	Diving	Men's 3 m springboard
Gold	Anwar Mesbah	1936 Berlin	Egypt	Weightlifting	Men's lightweight
Gold	Khadr El-Touni	1936 Berlin	Egypt	Weightlifting	Men's middleweight
Silver	Saleh Soliman	1936 Berlin	Egypt	Weightlifting	Men's featherweight
Bronze	Ibrahim Shams	1936 Berlin	Egypt	Weightlifting	Men's featherweight
Bronze	Ibrahim Wasif	1936 Berlin	Egypt	Weightlifting	Men's light heavyweight
Gold	Mahmoud Fayad	1948 London	Egypt	Weightlifting	Men's featherweight
Gold	Ibrahim Shams	1948 London	Egypt	Weightlifting	Men's lightweight
Silver	Attia Hamouda	1948 London	Egypt	Weightlifting	Men's lightweight
Silver	Mahmoud Hassan	1948 London	Egypt	Wrestling	Men's Greco-Roman bantamweight
Bronze	Ibrahim Orabi	1948 London	Egypt	Wrestling	Men's Greco-Roman light heavyweight
Bronze	Abdel Aal Rashed	1952 Helsinki	Egypt	Wrestling	Men's Greco-Roman featherweight
Silver	Osman El-Sayed	1960 Rome	Egypt	Wrestling	Men's Greco-Roman flyweight
Bronze	Abdel Moneim El-Guindi	1960 Rome	Egypt	Boxing	Men's flyweight
Silver	Mohamed Ali Rashwan	1984 Los Angeles	Egypt	Judo	Men's open
Gold	Karam Gaber	2004 Athens	Egypt	Wrestling	Men's Greco-Roman 96 kg
Silver	Mohamed Aly	2004 Athens	Egypt	Boxing	Men's super heavyweight
Bronze	Ahmed Ismail	2004 Athens	Egypt	Boxing	Men's light heavyweight
Bronze	Mohamed Elsayed	2004 Athens	Egypt	Boxing	Men's heavyweight
Bronze	Tamer Bayoumi	2004 Athens	Egypt	Taekwondo	Men's 58 kg
Bronze	Hesham Mesbah	2008 Beijing	Egypt	Judo	Men's −90 kg
Bronze	Abeer Abdelrahman	2008 Beijing	Egypt	Weightlifting	Women's 69 kg
Silver	Alaaeldin Abouelkassem	2012 London	Egypt	Fencing	Men's foil
Silver	Abeer Abdelrahman	2012 London	Egypt	Weightlifting	Women's 75 kg
Silver	Karam Gaber	2012 London	Egypt	Wrestling	Men's Greco-Roman 84 kg
Bronze	Tarek Yehia	2012 London	Egypt	Weightlifting	Men's 85 kg
Bronze	Mohamed Ehab	2016 Rio de Janeiro	Egypt	Weightlifting	Men's 77 kg
Bronze	Sara Ahmed	2016 Rio de Janeiro	Egypt	Weightlifting	Women's 69 kg
Bronze	Hedaya Malak	2016 Rio de Janeiro	Egypt	Taekwondo	Women's 57 kg
Gold	Feryal Abdelaziz	2020 Tokyo	Egypt	Karate	Women's +61 kg
Silver	Ahmed El-Gendy	2020 Tokyo	Egypt	Modern pentathlon	Men's
Bronze	Hedaya Malak	2020 Tokyo	Egypt	Taekwondo	Women's 67 kg
Bronze	Seif Eissa	2020 Tokyo	Egypt	Taekwondo	Men's 80 kg
Bronze	Mohamed Ibrahim El-Sayed	2020 Tokyo	Egypt	Wrestling	Men's Greco-Roman 67 kg
Bronze	Giana Farouk	2020 Tokyo	Egypt	Karate	Women's −61 kg
Gold	Ahmed El-Gendy	2024 Paris	Egypt	Modern pentathlon	Men's
Silver	Sara Ahmed	2024 Paris	Egypt	Weightlifting	Women's 81 kg
Bronze	Mohamed El-Sayed	2024 Paris	Egypt	Fencing	Men's épée
Silver	Rhadi Ben Abdesselam	1960 Rome	Morocco	Athletics	Men's marathon
Gold	Nawal El Moutawakel	1984 Los Angeles	Morocco	Athletics	Women's 400 metre hurdles
Gold	Saïd Aouita	1984 Los Angeles	Morocco	Athletics	Men's 5,000 metres
Gold	Brahim Boutayeb	1988 Seoul	Morocco	Athletics	Men's 10,000 metres
Bronze	Saïd Aouita	1988 Seoul	Morocco	Athletics	Men's 800 metres
Bronze	Abdelhak Achik	1988 Seoul	Morocco	Boxing	Men's featherweight
Gold	Khalid Skah	1992 Barcelona	Morocco	Athletics	Men's 10,000 metres
Silver	Rachid El Basir	1992 Barcelona	Morocco	Athletics	Men's 1,500 metres
Bronze	Mohammed Achik	1992 Barcelona	Morocco	Boxing	Men's bantamweight
Bronze	Salah Hissou	1996 Atlanta	Morocco	Athletics	Men's 10,000 metres
Bronze	Khalid Boulami	1996 Atlanta	Morocco	Athletics	Men's 5,000 metres
Silver	Hicham El Guerrouj	2000 Sydney	Morocco	Athletics	Men's 1,500 metres
Bronze	Ali Ezzine	2000 Sydney	Morocco	Athletics	Men's 3,000 metre steeplechase
Bronze	Nezha Bidouane	2000 Sydney	Morocco	Athletics	Women's 400 metre hurdles
Bronze	Brahim Lahlafi	2000 Sydney	Morocco	Athletics	Men's 5,000 metres
Bronze	Tahar Tamsamani	2000 Sydney	Morocco	Boxing	Men's featherweight
Gold	Hicham El Guerrouj	2004 Athens	Morocco	Athletics	Men's 1,500 metres
Gold	Hicham El Guerrouj	2004 Athens	Morocco	Athletics	Men's 5,000 metres
Silver	Hasna Benhassi	2004 Athens	Morocco	Athletics	Women's 800 metres
Silver	Jaouad Gharib	2008 Beijing	Morocco	Athletics	Men's marathon
Bronze	Hasna Benhassi	2008 Beijing	Morocco	Athletics	Women's 800 metres
Bronze	Abdalaati Iguider	2012 London	Morocco	Athletics	Men's 1500 metres
Bronze	Mohammed Rabii	2016 Rio de Janeiro	Morocco	Boxing	Men's welterweight
Gold	Soufiane El Bakkali	2020 Tokyo	Morocco	Athletics	Men's 3000 metres steeplechase
Gold	Soufiane El Bakkali	2024 Paris	Morocco	Athletics	Men's 3000 metres steeplechase
Bronze	Men's Football team	2024 Paris	Morocco	Football	Men's competition
Bronze	Mustapha Moussa	1984 Los Angeles	Algeria	Boxing	Men's light-heavyweight
Bronze	Mohamed Zaoui	1984 Los Angeles	Algeria	Boxing	Men's middleweight
Gold	Hassiba Boulmerka	1992 Barcelona	Algeria	Athletics	Women's 1500 metres
Bronze	Hocine Soltani	1992 Barcelona	Algeria	Boxing	Men's featherweight
Gold	Noureddine Morceli	1996 Atlanta	Algeria	Athletics	Men's 1500 metres
Gold	Hocine Soltani	1996 Atlanta	Algeria	Boxing	Men's lightweight
Bronze	Mohamed Bahari	1996 Atlanta	Algeria	Boxing	Men's middleweight
Gold	Nouria Merah-Benida	2000 Sydney	Algeria	Athletics	Women's 1500 metres
Silver	Ali Saïdi-Sief	2000 Sydney	Algeria	Athletics	Men's 5000 metres
Bronze	Abderrahmane Hammad	2000 Sydney	Algeria	Athletics	Men's high jump
Bronze	Djabir Saïd-Guerni	2000 Sydney	Algeria	Athletics	Men's 800 metres
Bronze	Mohamed Allalou	2000 Sydney	Algeria	Boxing	Men's light-welterweight
Silver	Amar Benikhlef	2008 Beijing	Algeria	Judo	Men's -90 kg
Bronze	Soraya Haddad	2008 Beijing	Algeria	Judo	Women's -52 kg
Gold	Taoufik Makhloufi	2012 London	Algeria	Athletics	Men's 1500 metres
Silver	Taoufik Makhloufi	2016 Rio de Janeiro	Algeria	Athletics	Men's 800 metres
Silver	Taoufik Makhloufi	2016 Rio de Janeiro	Algeria	Athletics	Men's 1500 metres
Gold	Kaylia Nemour	2024 Paris	Algeria	Gymnastics	Women's uneven bars
Gold	Imane Khelif	2024 Paris	Algeria	Boxing	Women's 66 kg
Bronze	Djamel Sedjati	2024 Paris	Algeria	Athletics	Men's 800 metres
Silver	Mohammed Gammoudi	1964 Tokyo	Tunisia	Athletics	Men's 10,000 m
Bronze	Habib Galhia	1964 Tokyo	Tunisia	Boxing	Men's light welterweight
Gold	Mohammed Gammoudi	1968 Mexico City	Tunisia	Athletics	Men's 5000 m
Bronze	Mohammed Gammoudi	1968 Mexico City	Tunisia	Athletics	Men's 10,000 m
Silver	Mohammed Gammoudi	1972 Munich	Tunisia	Athletics	Men's 5000 m
Bronze	Fethi Missaoui	1996 Atlanta	Tunisia	Boxing	Men's light welterweight
Gold	Oussama Mellouli	2008 Beijing	Tunisia	Swimming	Men's 1500 m freestyle
Gold	Oussama Mellouli	2012 London	Tunisia	Swimming	Men's 10km marathon
Gold	Habiba Ghribi	2012 London	Tunisia	Athletics	Women's 3000 m steeplechase
Bronze	Oussama Mellouli	2012 London	Tunisia	Swimming	Men's 1500 m freestyle
Bronze	Inès Boubakri	2016 Rio de Janeiro	Tunisia	Fencing	Women's Foil
Bronze	Oussama Oueslati	2016 Rio de Janeiro	Tunisia	Taekwondo	Men's 80 kg
Bronze	Marwa Amri	2016 Rio de Janeiro	Tunisia	Wrestling	Women's freestyle 58 kg
Gold	Ahmed Hafnaoui	2020 Tokyo	Tunisia	Swimming	Men's 400 m freestyle
Silver	Mohamed Khalil Jendoubi	2020 Tokyo	Tunisia	Taekwondo	Men's 58 kg
Gold	Firas Katoussi	2024 Paris	Tunisia	Taekwondo	Men's 80 kg
Silver	Farès Ferjani	2024 Paris	Tunisia	Fencing	Men's sabre
Bronze	Mohamed Khalil Jendoubi	2024 Paris	Tunisia	Taekwondo	Men's 58 kg
Silver	Ismail Ahmed Ismail	2008 Beijing	Sudan	Athletics	Men's 800 metres
Bronze	Houssein Ahmed Salah	1988 Seoul	Djibouti	Athletics	Men's marathon
Silver	Zakaria Chihab	1952 Helsinki	Lebanon	Wrestling	Men's Greco-Roman bantamweight
Bronze	Khalil Taha	1952 Helsinki	Lebanon	Wrestling	Men's Greco-Roman welterweight
Silver	Mohamed Traboulsi	1972 Munich	Lebanon	Weightlifting	Men's 75 kg
Bronze	Hassan Bechara	1980 Moscow	Lebanon	Wrestling	Men's Greco-Roman +100 kg
Silver	Joseph Atiyeh	1984 Los Angeles	Syria	Wrestling	Men's freestyle 100 kg
Gold	Ghada Shouaa	1996 Atlanta	Syria	Athletics	Women's heptathlon
Bronze	Nasser Al Shami	2004 Athens	Syria	Boxing	Men's heavyweight
Bronze	Man Asaad	2020 Tokyo	Syria	Weightlifting	Men's 109+kg
Gold	Ahmad Abu-Ghaush	2016 Rio de Janeiro	Jordan	Taekwondo	Men's 68 kg
Silver	Saleh El-Sharabaty	2020 Tokyo	Jordan	Taekwondo	Men's 80 kg
Bronze	Abdelrahman Al-Masatfa	2020 Tokyo	Jordan	Karate	Men's 67 kg
Bronze	Zaid Kareem	2024 Paris	Jordan	Taekwondo	Men's 68 kg
Bronze	Abdul Wahid Aziz	1960 Rome	Iraq	Weightlifting	Men's Lightweight
Bronze	Fehaid Al-Deehani	2000 Sydney	Kuwait	Shooting	Men's double trap
Bronze	Fehaid Al-Deehani	2012 London	Kuwait	Shooting	Men's trap
Bronze	Abdullah Al-Rashidi	2020 Tokyo	Kuwait	Shooting	Men's skeet
Gold	Fehaid Al-Deehani	2016 Rio de Janeiro	Independent Olympic Athletes	Shooting	Men's double trap
Bronze	Abdullah Al-Rashidi	2016 Rio de Janeiro	Independent Olympic Athletes	Shooting	Men's skeet
Silver	Hadi Al-Somaily	2000 Sydney	Saudi Arabia	Athletics	Men's 400 metre hurdles
Silver	Tareg Hamedi	2020 Tokyo	Saudi Arabia	Karate	Men's +75 kg
Bronze	Khaled Al Eid	2000 Sydney	Saudi Arabia	Equestrian	Individual show jumping
Bronze	Ramzy Al Duhami Abdullah Al Saud Kamal Bahamdan Abdullah Sharbatly	2012 London	Saudi Arabia	Equestrian	Team jumping
Gold	Maryam Yusuf Jamal	2012 London	Bahrain	Athletics	Women's 1500 m
Gold	Ruth Jebet	2016 Rio de Janeiro	Bahrain	Athletics	Women's 3000 m steeplechase
Silver	Eunice Kirwa	2016 Rio de Janeiro	Bahrain	Athletics	Women's marathon
Silver	Kalkidan Gezahegne	2020 Tokyo	Bahrain	Athletics	Women's 10,000 m
Gold	Winfred Yavi	2024 Paris	Bahrain	Athletics	Women's 3000 m steeplechase
Gold	Akhmed Tazhudinov	2024 Paris	Bahrain	Wrestling	Men's −97 kg
Silver	Salwa Eid Naser	2024 Paris	Bahrain	Athletics	Women's 400 m
Bronze	Gor Minasyan	2024 Paris	Bahrain	Weightlifting	Men's +102 kg
Bronze	Mohammed Suleiman	1992 Barcelona	Qatar	Athletics	Men's 1500 metres
Bronze	Said Saif Asaad	2000 Sydney	Qatar	Weightlifting	Men's 105 kg
Bronze	Nasser Al-Attiyah	2012 London	Qatar	Shooting	Men's skeet
Silver	Mutaz Essa Barshim	2012 London	Qatar	Athletics	Men's high jump
Silver	Mutaz Essa Barshim	2016 Rio de Janeiro	Qatar	Athletics	Men's high jump
Gold	Mutaz Essa Barshim	2020 Tokyo	Qatar	Athletics	Men's high jump
Gold	Fares Ibrahim	2020 Tokyo	Qatar	Weightlifting	Men's 96 kg
Bronze	Ahmed Tijan and Cherif Younousse	2020 Tokyo	Qatar	Beach volleyball	Men's tournament
Bronze	Mutaz Essa Barshim	2024 Paris	Qatar	Athletics	Men's high jump
Gold	Ahmed Al Maktoum	2004 Athens	United Arab Emirates	Shooting	Men's double trap
Bronze	Sergiu Toma	2016 Rio de Janeiro	United Arab Emirates	Judo	Men's 81 kg

== Football ==
=== FIFA World Cup ===
Four African and six Asian members of the Arab League have qualified for the FIFA World Cup, with Morocco recording the most notable achievement by reaching the semi-finals in 2022. The 2022 FIFA World Cup was held in Qatar, whilst the 2030 and 2034 FIFA World Cups are set to be held in Morocco and Saudi Arabia, respectively.

==== Team results by tournament ====
The team ranking in each tournament is according to FIFA. The rankings, apart from the top four positions (top two in 1930), are not a result of direct competition between the teams; instead, teams eliminated in the same round are ranked by their full results in the tournament.

For each tournament, the number of teams in each finals tournament (in brackets) are shown.

Team	1930 (Uruguay) (13)	1934 (Italy) (16)	1938 (France) (15)	1950 (Brazil) (13)	1954 (Switzerland) (16)	1958 (Sweden) (16)	1962 (Chile) (16)	1966 (England) (16)	1970 (Mexico) (16)	1974 (West Germany) (16)	1978 (Argentina) (16)	1982 (Spain) (24)	1986 (Mexico) (24)	1990 (Italy) (24)	1994 (United States) (24)	1998 (France) (32)	2002 (South Korea) (Japan) (32)	2006 (Germany) (32)	2010 (South Africa) (32)	2014 (Brazil) (32)	2018 (Russia) (32)	2022 (Qatar) (32)	2026 (Canada) (Mexico) (United States) (48)	2030 (Morocco) (Portugal) (Spain) (48)	2034 (Saudi Arabia) (48)	Total
Algeria	—							×	•	•	•	R1; 13th	R1; 22nd	•	•	•	•	•	R1; 28th	R2; 14th	•	•	R2; 30th	TBD	TBD	5
Egypt	••	R1; 13th	×		•	×	×	×		•	•	•	•	R1; 20th	•	•	•	•	•	•	R1; 31st	•	R3; 15th	TBD	TBD	4
Iraq	—									•	×	•	R1; 23rd	•	•	•	•	•	•	•	•	•	R1; 48th	TBD	TBD	2
Jordan	—														•	•	•	•	•	•	•	•	R1; 44th	TBD	TBD	1
Kuwait	—									•	•	R1; 21st	•	•	•	•	•	•	•	•	•	•	•	TBD	TBD	1
Morocco	—						•	×	R1; 14th	•	•	•	R2; 11th	•	R1; 23rd	R1; 18th	•	•	•	•	R1; 27th	4th	QF; 7th	Q	TBD	8
Qatar	—									x	•	•	•	•	•	•	•	•	•	•	•	R1; 32nd	R1; 41st	TBD	TBD	2
Saudi Arabia	—										•	•	•	•	R2; 12th	R1; 28th	R1; 32nd	R1; 28th	•	•	R1; 26th	R1; 25th	R1; 38th	TBD	Q	8
Tunisia	—						•	×	•	•	R1; 9th	•	•	•	•	R1; 26th	R1; 29th	R1; 24th	•	•	R1; 24th	R1; 21st	R1; 47th	TBD	TBD	7
United Arab Emirates	—										×		•	R1; 24th	•	•	•	•	•	•	•	•	•	TBD	TBD	1
Total	0	1	0	0	0	0	0	0	1	0	1	2	3	2	2	3	2	2	1	1	4	4	7			32

==== Legend ====
1st	Champions
2nd	Runners-up
3rd	Third place
4th	Fourth place
QF	Quarter-finals (1934–1938, 1954–1970, and 1986–present: knockout round of 8)
R3	Round 3 (2026–present: knockout round of 16)
R2	Round 2 (1974–1978, second group stage, top 8; 1982: second group stage, top 12; 1986–2022: knockout round of 16; 2026–present: knockout round of 32)
R1	Round 1 (1930, 1950–1970 and 1986–present: group stage; 1934–1938: knockout round of 16; 1974–1982: first group stage)

Q	Qualified for upcoming tournament
TBD	To be determined (may still qualify for upcoming tournament)
••	Qualified but withdrew
•	Did not qualify
×	Withdrew before qualification / Banned / Entry not accepted by FIFA
	Hosts
	Did not enter
—	Not a FIFA member

=== Football Federations ===
The Union of Arab Football Associations (UAFA), founded in 1974, is the governing body for football in the Arab world. It organizes several regional competitions, including the Arab Cup and the Arab Club Champions Cup. Since 2021, the Arab Cup for national teams has been organized by FIFA. UAFA also oversees other football-related tournaments, including the Arab Beach Soccer Cup and Arab Futsal Cup.

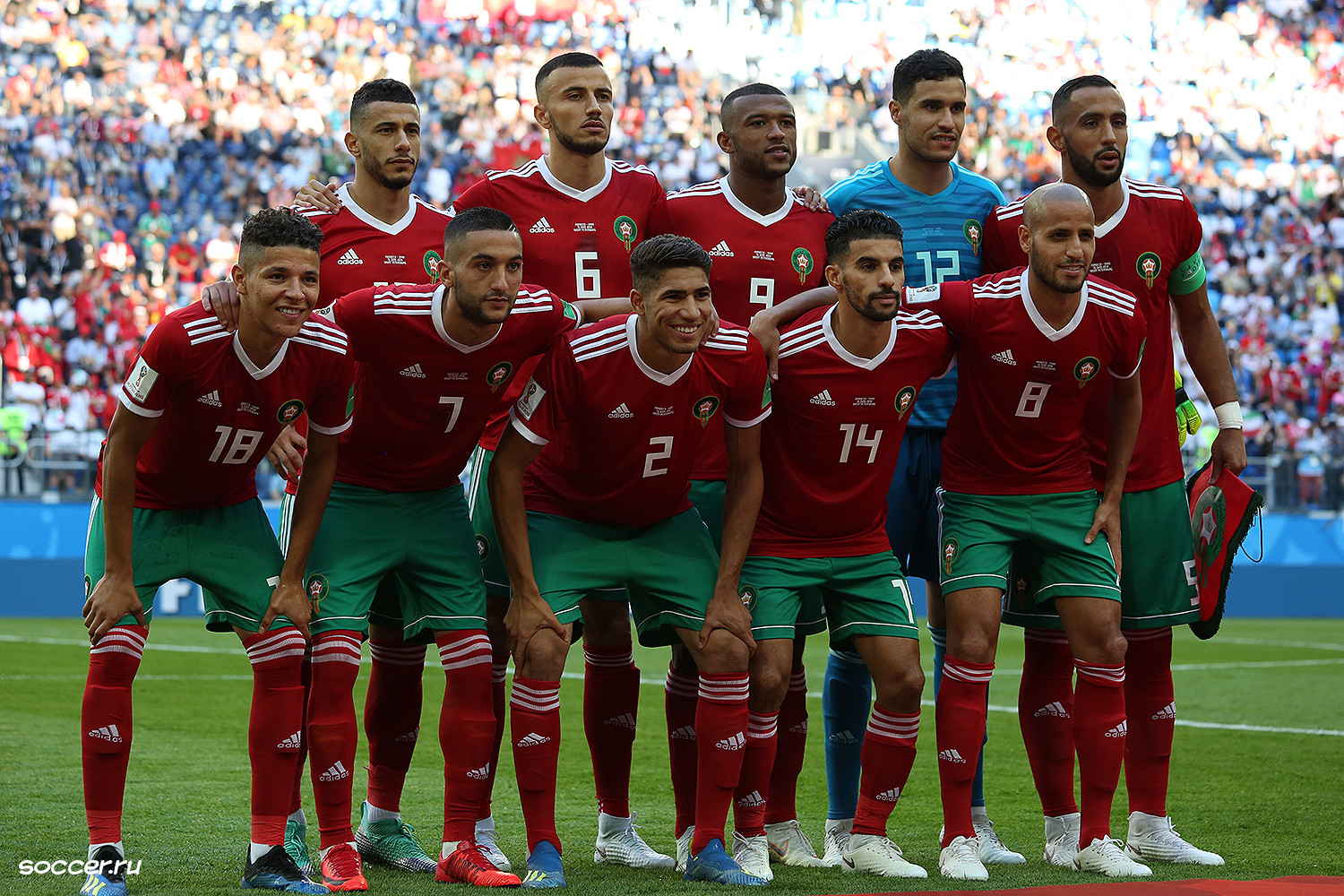
Morocco at the 2018 FIFA World Cup

Other football federations composed entirely of Arab nations include the Union of North African Football (UNAF), the West Asian Football Federation (WAFF), and the Gulf Football Federation (GFF).

=== Confederation of African Football (CAF) ===
Arab states have played an important role in the history of the Confederation of African Football (CAF). The confederation was founded in Khartoum, Sudan and is currently headquartered in Giza, Egypt. Shortly after its establishment, Sudan hosted the inaugural Africa Cup of Nation (AFCON). Since then, African member states of the Arab League have hosted 12 editions of the tournament and have won the competition on 12 occasions.

==== Hosts ====
Ed.	Year	Host	(gold) Champion	Teams
1	1957	Sudan	Egypt	3 (Note: South Africa were disqualified due to the country's apartheid policies.)
2	1959	United Arab Republic	United Arab Republic	3
5	1965	Tunisia	Ghana	6
7	1970	Sudan	Sudan	8
9	1974	Egypt	Zaire	8
13	1982	Libya	Ghana	8
15	1986	Egypt	Egypt	8
16	1988	Morocco	Cameroon	8
17	1990	Algeria	Algeria	8
19	1994	Tunisia	Nigeria	12
24	2004	Tunisia	Tunisia	16
25	2006	Egypt	Egypt	16
32	2019	Egypt	Algeria	24
35	2025	Morocco	Morocco	24

==== Winners ====
Team	Winners	Runners-up	Third place	Fourth place	Total
Egypt	7 (1957, 1959, 1986, 1998, 2006, 2008, 2010)	3 (1962, 2017, 2021)	3 (1963, 1970, 1974)	4 (1976, 1980, 1984, 2025)	17
Algeria	2 (1990, 2019)	1 (1980)	2 (1984, 1988)	2 (1982, 2010)	7
Morocco	2 (1976, 2025)	1 (2004)	1 (1980)	2 (1986, 1988)	7
Tunisia	1 (2004)	2 (1965, 1996)	1 (1962)	3 (1978, 2000, 2019)	7
Sudan	1 (1970)	2 (1959, 1963)	1 (1957)	—	4
Libya	—	1 (1982)	—	—	1

=== Asian Football Confederation (AFC) ===
Likewise, Asian members of the Arab League have hosted seven AFC Asian Cups, winning seven editions.

==== Hosts ====
Ed.	Year	Hosts	Champions	Number of teams
7	1980	Kuwait	Kuwait	10
9	1988	Qatar	Saudi Arabia	10
11	1996	United Arab Emirates	Saudi Arabia	12
12	2000	Lebanon	Japan	12
15	2011	Qatar	Japan	16
17	2019	United Arab Emirates	Qatar	24
18	2023	Qatar	Qatar	24
19	2027	Saudi Arabia	TBD	24

==== Summary ====
Team	Champions	Runners-up	Third place	Fourth place	Semi-finalist	Top 4 total
Saudi Arabia	3 (1984, 1988, 1996)	3 (1992, 2000, 2007)	—N/a	—N/a	—N/a	6
Qatar	2 (2019, 2023)	—N/a	—N/a	—N/a	—N/a	2
Kuwait	1 (1980)	1 (1976)	1 (1984)	1 (1996)	—N/a	4
Iraq	1 (2007)	—N/a	—N/a	2 (1976, 2015)	—N/a	3
United Arab Emirates	—N/a	1 (1996)	1 (2015)	1 (1992)	1 (2019)	4
Jordan	—N/a	1 (2023)	—N/a	—N/a	—N/a	1
Bahrain	—N/a	—N/a	—N/a	1 (2004)	—N/a	1

== Tennis ==
=== Egyptian Open (1925-2002) ===
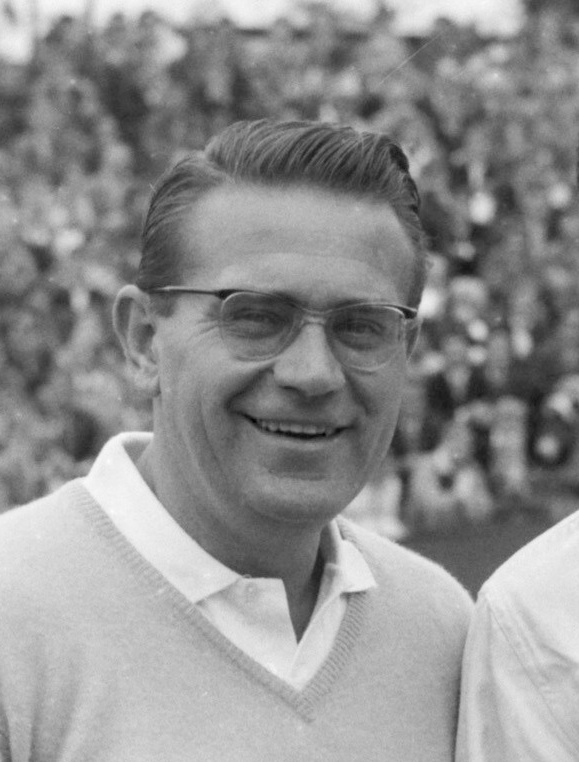
Jaroslav Drobný, the only Grand Slam winner to represent an Arab country

The Egyptian Open was the first tennis tournament held in the Arab world, having been established in 1925 and remaining in existence until its discontinuation in 2002. It was staged almost annually and attracted many prominent players, including Gottfried von Cramm, Henri Cochet, Frank Parker, Lew Hoad, Manuel Santana, and Thomas Muster. Due to its longevity, the tournament saw participation from players representing countries including Nazi Germany, the Soviet Union, and Yugoslavia; several of whom went on to win the event. Roderich Menzel, Jaroslav Drobný and Nicola Pietrangeli each won the tournament a record four times.

=== ATP Tour ===
Three Arab cities currently host events on the ATP Tour, forming part of the men’s professional tennis calendar. The Dubai Tennis Championships, held in Dubai in the United Arab Emirates, is an ATP 500 tournament played on outdoor hard courts. Similarly, the Qatar Open, currently known for sponsorship reasons as the Qatar ExxonMobil Open, is also an annual ATP 500 tournament played on outdoor hard courts in Doha, Qatar and traditionally held early in the season. The Grand Prix Hassan II in Morocco is the third and only tournament on the African continent, it is an ATP 250 clay‑court event.

In addition, Saudi Arabia has been awarded a future ATP Masters 1000 event, set to debut as early as 2028, marking a significant expansion of the Tour’s elite category.

=== Arab Athletes ===
Arab tennis players have competed in international professional tennis since the mid‑20th century, achieving a range of noteworthy results on the ATP and WTA Tours. The only player to win a Grand Slam while representing an Arab country is the naturalized Jaroslav Drobný, whilst representing Egypt; he reached eight Grand Slam finals and won three singles titles.

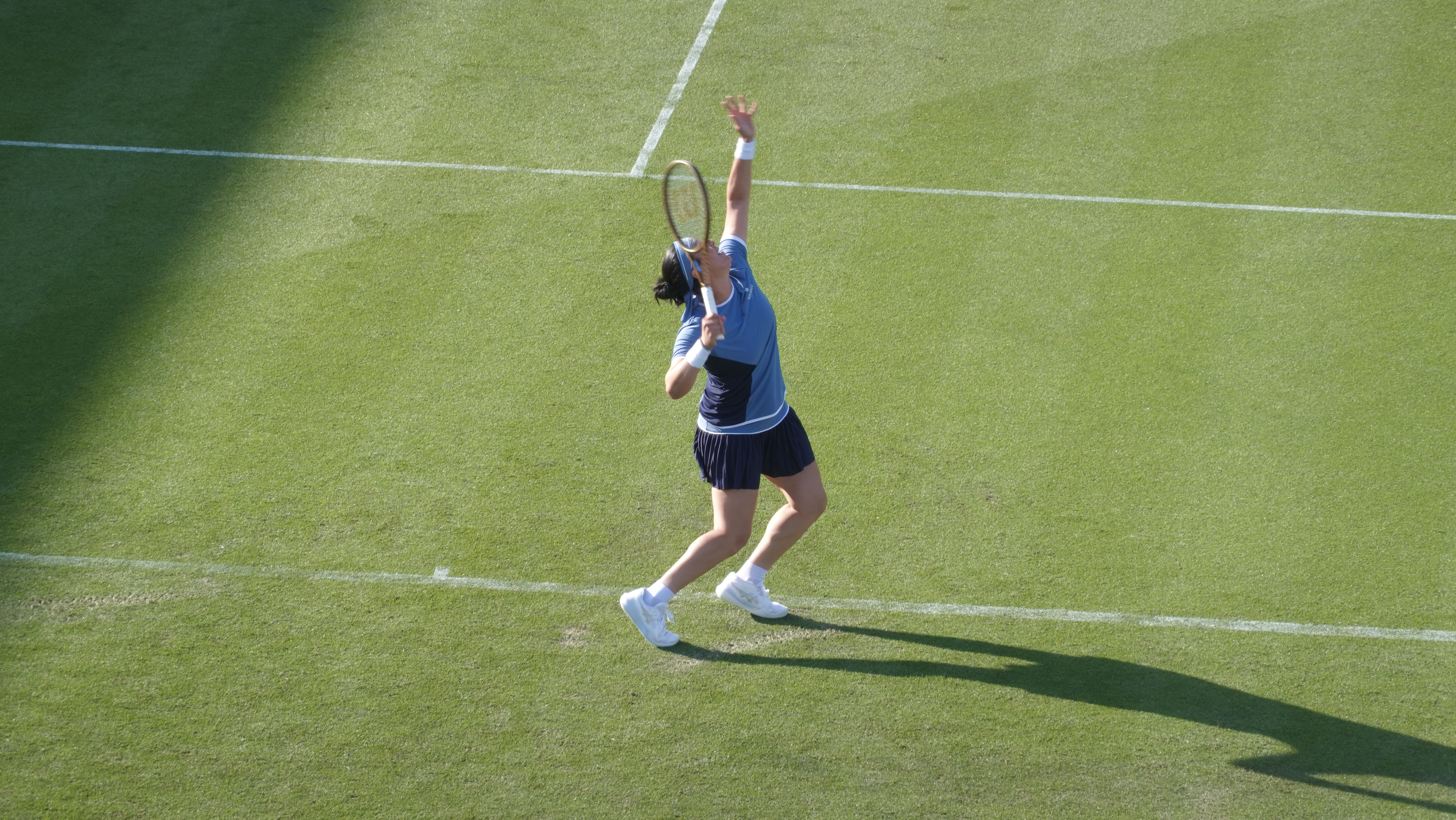
Ons Jabeur at the 2025 Eastbourne Open

Several Arab male players have reached the top 50 in the ATP rankings, including Younes El Aynaoui (No. 14), Hicham Arazi (No. 22), Karim Alami (No. 25), Ismail El Shafei (No. 34) and Malek Jaziri (No. 42). On the women’s side, Selima Sfar of Tunisia made history by becoming the first Arab female to enter the top 100, reaching No. 75 in 2001. She was later surpassed by Mayar Sherif (No. 31 in 2023) and Ons Jabeur, achieving a career-high ranking of No. 2 in 2022, the highest ever for any Arab athlete, male or female, in the 21st century.

Several top‑10 ranked and Olympic‑medalists were born in Arab countries but chose to represent other nations, including Guy Forget, Françoise Dürr, Nicola Pietrangeli, Pierre Darmon, and Arnaud Di Pasquale.

== Motor Racing ==
=== Early History ===
The first Grand Prix events held in the Arab World were the Tripoli Grand Prix and the Moroccan Grand Prix, both inaugurated in 1925. The success of the Italian-organized race in Libya, combined with the growing popularity of the Moroccan Grand Prix, helped motor racing flourish across North Africa and led to the debut of the Tunis Grand Prix and Algerian Grand Prix in 1928, marking the expansion of competitive motorsport throughout the region. These races attracted top European drivers and teams, showcasing some of the fastest and most challenging circuits of the era.

Tripoli became especially renowned for its purpose-built Mellaha Circuit, considered one of the fastest tracks of the 1930s, Tunis featured street and coastal circuits around Tunis and Carthage and the Algerian Prix was held on a variety of coastal courses, becoming a key event in the colonial-era European racing calendar. The most prominent, the Moroccan Grand Prix, evolved through several circuits, culminating in the Ain-Diab Circuit, a Formula One road circuit built in 1957. All four races had ceased to exist by the mid-20th century.

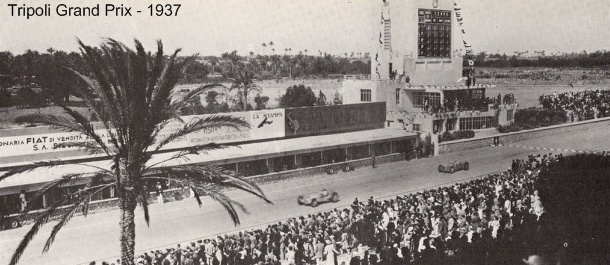
1937 Tripoli Grand Prix

=== Formula 1 ===
The Arab world has a rich history with Formula One and top-level motorsport, beginning with early races such as the 1947 Gezira Grand Prix in Cairo, Egypt. This one-off event, also known as the Cairo Grand Prix or Pyramids Circuit, was held on public roads on Gezira Island and marked one of the earliest major competitive motor races in the Arab world, attracting international drivers. The next F1 race hosted in the Arab world was the 1958 Moroccan Grand Prix at the Ain-Diab Circuit in Casablanca, which served as the final round of the Formula One World Championship that year. Following the Moroccan Grand Prix, the Arab world experienced a hiatus from top-level motorsport lasting more than four decades.

At the turn of the century, interest in hosting an international motorsport event in the Arab world resurfaced. Beirut, Lebanon was proposed as a Formula One host city in 1999, with a 4.1 km street circuit planned around Zaituna Bay and a target date for the inaugural race in 2002. Around the same time, Egyptian motorsport officials expressed confidence that the country could be ready to stage a Formula One race by the end of 2004, whilst Tunisia also announced intentions to pursue an F1 event, with the president of the Tunisian Automobile Club indicating readiness to engage with the Fédération Internationale de l'Automobile (FIA) for a future Grand Prix. However, none of these proposals ultimately came to fruition due to political instability, funding difficulties, and competing bids.

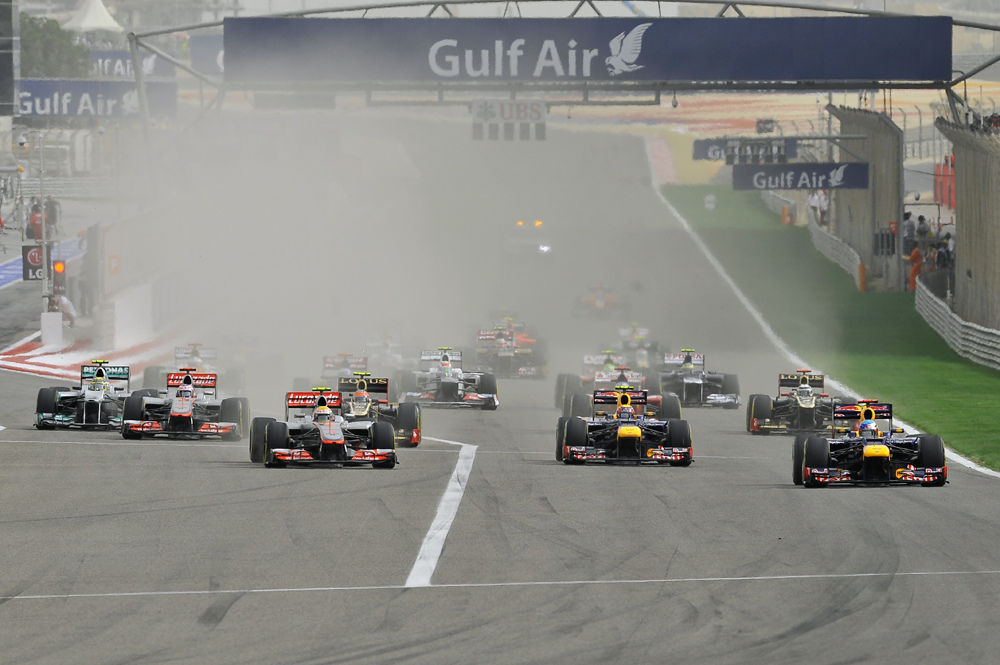
2012 Bahrain Grand Prix

The long-awaited revival of Formula One in the Arab world was finally realized when Bahrain secured its place on the F1 calendar, hosting the inaugural Bahrain Grand Prix in 2004. Since then, several other Arab cities have hosted races, including the Abu Dhabi Grand Prix at Yas Marina Circuit (2009-), the Saudi Arabian Grand Prix on the Jeddah Corniche Circuit (2021-), and the Qatar Grand Prix at Lusail International Circuit (2021, 2023-). In addition to these, there are two FIA Grade One circuits that have never hosted a Formula One race: Kuwait Motor Town and Dubai Autodrome. The region also features two FIA Grade Two circuits, Marrakech Street Circuit and Circuit Sidi Daoui de Oued Zem in Morocco, as well as one FIA Grade Three circuit, the Riyadh Street Circuit. The Qiddiya Speed Park Track is expected to replace the Jeddah Corniche Circuit as the Saudi Arabian Grand Prix venue in 2028. In 2025, Morocco revealed plans to return to the Formula One calendar with a proposed £887 million project in Tangier.

As of 2026, four Arab sovereign wealth funds hold stakes in Formula One teams. Bahrain’s Mumtalakat Holding Company is the major shareholder of McLaren Racing, whilst Abu Dhabi’s CYVN Holdings owns 100% of McLaren Automotive and holds a non-controlling stake in the racing team. Saudi Arabia’s Public Investment Fund (PIF) owns a 20.5% stake in Aston Martin and holds 8% of the Aston Martin Aramco F1 Team. The Qatar Investment Authority (QIA) owns a 17% stake of the Volkswagen Group and a 30% stake in Sauber Motorsport, which operates the Audi Revolut F1 Team, and the Kuwait Investment Authority holds a 4.94% stake in Mercedes-Benz Group, which in turn controls 33.3% of the Mercedes-AMG Petronas F1 Team.

==== Drivers ====
Only one driver has competed in a Formula One World Championship race while representing an Arab nation: Robert La Caze, who represented Morocco in 1958. Several other F1 drivers have been of Arab descent such as Isack Hadjar, Felipe Nasr and Tony Kanaan. Female drivers from the Arab world have also begun to emerge in international motorsport, with pioneers such as Hamda Al Qubaisi, Amna Al Qubaisi, Reema Juffali, and Sofia Zanfari helping to pave the way for future generations of Arab women in racing.

=== Rallying ===
Rallying in the Arab world began in Algeria with early endurance events such as the Algiers–Gao Rally, first held in 1930. Morocco followed with the establishment of the Rallye du Maroc in 1934, which would become one of the region’s most enduring and prestigious rally events. Algeria later served as the starting point for the Algiers–Cape Town Rally, held between 1951 and 1961. Organized by French authorities, the event covered approximately 10,000 miles (16,000 km) from the Mediterranean coast to South Africa and was among the longest rallies ever staged, significantly increasing international interest in long-distance rallying.

From the latter half of the 20th century onward, the Arab world became a regular host of internationally sanctioned rally events. These included rounds of the World Rally Championship, such as the Rallye du Maroc in Casablanca (1973, 1975–1976), Jordan Rally in Amman (2008, 2010–2011) and the only current Arab event on the calendar, Rally Saudi Arabia (2025-).

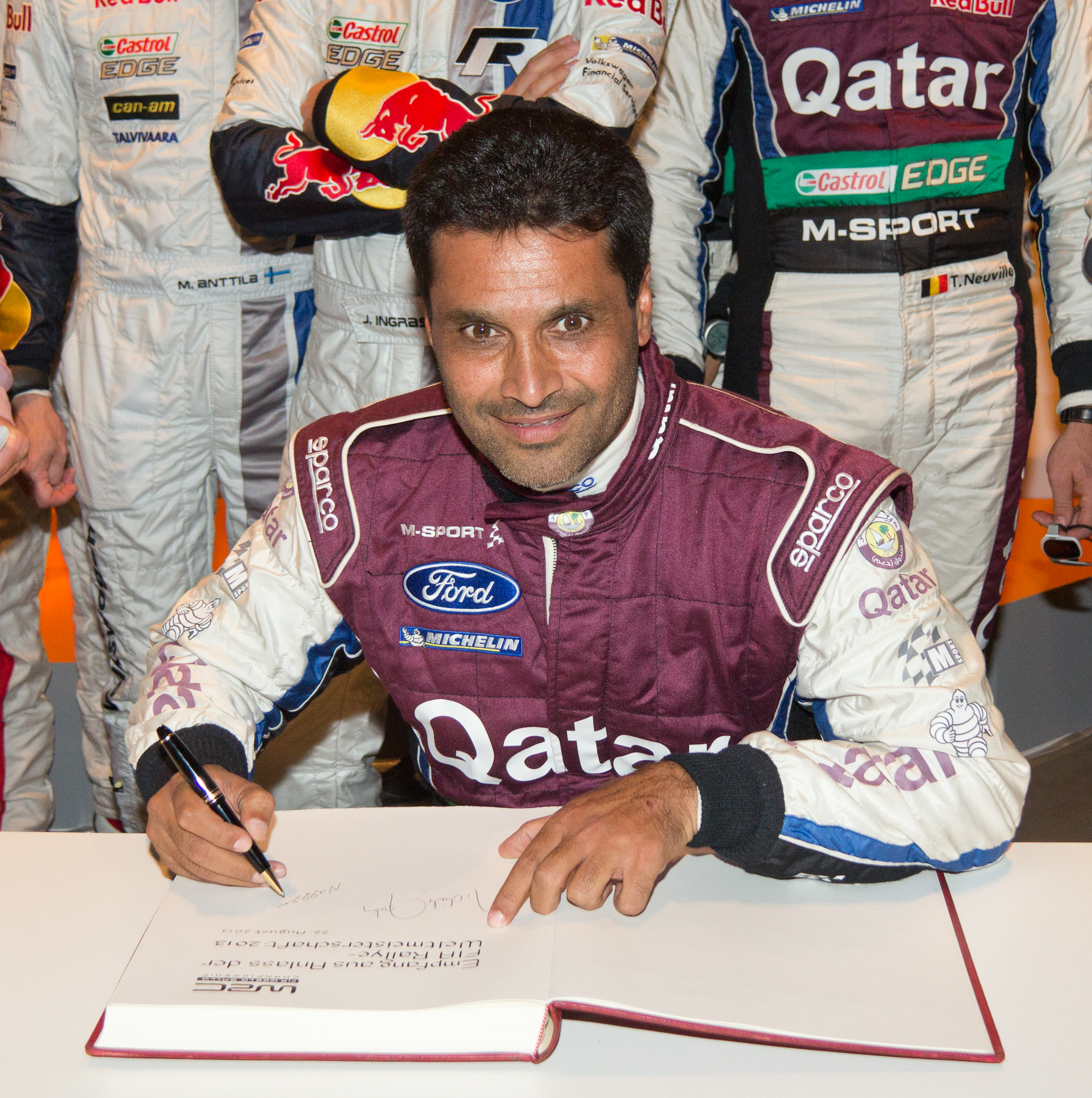
Nasser Al-Attiyah, a prominent Qatari rally driver

The region has also played a major role in rally-raid and cross-country rallying. From 1979 to 2007, the Dakar Rally has always passed through at least one Arab country, including Egypt, Libya, Tunisia, Algeria, Morocco, or Mauritania. However, the event was cancelled in 2008 due to security concerns, particularly following threats in Mauritania, and subsequently relocated outside Africa. The rally returned to the Arab world when Saudi Arabia secured the hosting rights under a 10-year agreement, staging the event annually from 2020 onward. An Arab manufacturer, SONACOME, won the truck category at the 1980 Dakar Rally, the three trucks entered by the Algerian brand finished first, third, and fourth in the inaugural season for the truck class, with the SONACOME M210 taking the overall win in the truck category.

Other notable competitions include the Abu Dhabi Desert Challenge, Rallye du Maroc (rally raid), Merzouga Rally, Rallye des Pharaons, and the Rally of Tunisia, all of which highlight the region’s desert terrain and endurance-focused rally tradition.

Among Arab competitors, Nasser Al-Attiyah of Qatar is the most prominent rally driver from the region. He was the 2006 Production World Rally Champion, 2014 and 2015 WRC-2 champion, an 18 time Middle East Rally Champion, a five-time FIA World Cup for Cross-Country Rallies champion, a three-time World Rally-Raid Champion, and a six-time (2011, 2015, 2019, 2022, 2023, 2026) Dakar Rally winner. Other prominent drivers are Saudi Arabia's Yazeed Al-Rajhi and Algeria’s Miloud Ataouat, both winning an edition of the Dakar Rally.

== Other hosted tournaments ==
- 1978 All-Africa Games - Algiers
- 1991 All-Africa Games - Egypt
- 2006 Asian Games - Doha
- 2007 All-Africa Games - Algiers
- 2010 Asian Beach Games (Muscat)

=== Failed and withdrawn bids ===
- 2011 Asian Indoor Games (Doha)
- 2016 Summer Olympics (Doha)

== See also ==
- Sports in Africa
- Sports in Asia
- Boycotts of Israel in sports
