= Weightlifting at the 1928 Summer Olympics – Men's 67.5 kg =

Men's lightweight weightlifting at the Games of the IX Olympiad
- Date: 28 July
- Competitors: 16 from 11 nations

Medalists
| 1st place, gold medalist(s) | | Hans Haas | Austria |
| 1st place, gold medalist(s) | | Kurt Helbig | Germany |
| 3rd place, bronze medalist(s) | | Fernand Arnout | France |

The men's lightweight event was part of the weightlifting programme at the 1928 Summer Olympics in Amsterdam. The weight class was the second-lightest contested, and allowed weightlifters of up to 67.5 kilograms (148.8 pounds). The competition was held on Saturday, 28 July 1928.

== Records ==
These were the standing world and Olympic records (in kilograms) prior to the 1928 Summer Olympics.

| World Record | Press | 100 | (Germany) Hans Wölpert | Munich (GER) | 1926 |
| World Record | Snatch | 105 | (Germany) Kurt Helbig | Koblenz (GER) | 1928 |
| World Record | Clean & Jerk | 135 | (Austria) Hans Haas | Vienna (AUT) | 1928 |
| World Record | Total | 330 | (Germany) Kurt Helbig | Koblenz (GER) | 1928 |
| Olympic Record | Press | 85 | (Estonia) Eduard Vanaaseme | Paris (FRA) | 22 July 1924 |
| Olympic Record | Snatch | 90 | (Czechoslovakia) Bohumil Durdis | Paris (FRA) | 22 July 1924 |
| Olympic Record | Clean & Jerk | 115 | (France) Edmond Decottignies | Paris (FRA) | 22 July 1924 |
| Olympic Record | Total | 277.5(*) | (France) Edmond Decottignies | Paris (FRA) | 22 July 1924 |

(*) Originally a five lift competition.

All four Olympic records were improved in this competition. Hans Haas and Kurt Helbig equalized the standing world record in clean and jerk.

== Results ==
All figures in kilograms.

| Rank | Weightlifter | Nation | Press | | | Snatch | | | Clean & jerk | | | Total |
| Rank | Weightlifter | Nation | 1. | 2. | 3. | 1. | 2. | 3. | 1. | 2. | 3. | Total |
|---|---|---|---|---|---|---|---|---|---|---|---|---|
| 1st place, gold medalist(s) | Hans Haas | Austria | 77.5 | 82.5 | 85 | 97.5 | 102.5 | X (105) | 130 | 135 | X (137.5) | 322.5 |
| 1st place, gold medalist(s) | Kurt Helbig | Germany | 85 | 90 | X (92.5) | 90 | 95 | 97.5 | 125 | 130 | 135 | 322.5 |
| 3rd place, bronze medalist(s) | Fernand Arnout | France | 80 | X (85) | 85 | 90 | X (95) | 97.5 | 115 | 120 | X (125) | 302.5 |
| 4 | Albert Aeschmann | Switzerland | 80 | 85 | 87.5 | 90 | X (95) | X (95) | 115 | 120 | X (125) | 297.5 |
| 5 | Willi Reinfrank | Germany | X (85) | 85 | 90 | 90 | X (95) | X (95) | 120 | X (125) | X (125) | 295 |
| 6 | Jules Meese | France | 85 | 90 | X (92.5) | 82.5 | X (87.5) | 87.5 | 110 | X (115) | 115 | 292.5 |
| 7 | Anton Hangel | Austria | X (77.5) | X (77.5) | 77.5 | X (90) | 90 | X (97.5) | 120 | X (130) | X (130) | 287.5 |
| 8 | Gastone Pierini | Italy | 85 | 90 | X (92.5) | X (82.5) | X (82.5) | 82.5 | 105 | X (110) | 110 | 282.5 |
| 9 | Joseph Jaquenoud | Switzerland | 75 | 80 | X (82.5) | X (82.5) | 82.5 | X (87.5) | 100 | 107.5 | 112.5 | 262.5 |
| 10 | Cor Tabak | Netherlands | 72.5 | X (77.5) | 77.5 | 77.5 | 82.5 | X (85) | 110 | 115 | X (117.5) | 270 |
| 11 | Josef Matějček | Czechoslovakia | 75 | 80 | 82.5 | 72.5 | 77.5 | X (80) | 100 | X (107.5) | 107.5 | 265 |
| 12 | V. Van Hamme | Belgium | 77.5 | - | - | 75 | X (80) | 80 | 105 | X (107.5) | - | 262.5 |
| 13 | Menotti Pozzacchio | Luxembourg | 70 | 75 | X (77.5) | 75 | 80 | X (82.5) | X (105) | 105 | X (110) | 260 |
| 14 | Gerrit Roos | Netherlands | 75 | X (80) | X (80) | X (75) | 75 | X (80) | 105 | X (110) | X (110) | 255 |
| 15 | Helge Sjögren | Sweden | 65 | 70 | X (75) | 77.5 | X (82.5) | X (82.5) | X (105) | X (105) | 105 | 252.5 |
| 16 | Henry Nissen | Denmark | 65 | 70 | X (75) | 70 | 75 | X (80) | 95 | X (100) | 105 | 245 |
| – | J. Adriaenssens | Belgium | DNF | | | | | | | | | |
| – | César Garibaldi | Argentina | DNF | | | | | | | | | |

== Sources ==
- Olympic Report
- Wudarski, Pawel (1999). "Wyniki Igrzysk Olimpijskich" (in Polish).
