= César Garibaldi =

Argentine weightlifter

Personal information
- Nationality: Argentine
- Born: 1907

Sport
- Sport: Weightlifting

César Garibaldi (born 1907) was an Argentine weightlifter. He competed in the men's lightweight event at the 1928 Summer Olympics.
