= Weightlifting at the 1936 Summer Olympics =

Weightlifting at the Games of the XI Olympiad
- Venue: Deutschlandhalle
- Dates: 2–5 August 1936
- Competitors: 80 from 15 nations

The weightlifting competition at the 1936 Summer Olympics in Berlin consisted of five weight classes, all for men only.

== Medal summary ==
Games	Gold	Silver	Bronze
Featherweight –60 kg	Anthony Terlazzo; United States	Saleh Soliman; Egypt	Ibrahim Shams; Egypt
Lightweight; 60–67.5 kg	Robert Fein; Austria	none awarded	Karl Jansen; Germany
Lightweight; 60–67.5 kg	Anwar Mesbah; Egypt	none awarded	Karl Jansen; Germany
Middleweight; 67.5–75 kg	Khadr El Touni; Egypt	Rudolf Ismayr; Germany	Adolf Wagner; Germany
Light-heavyweight; 75–82.5 kg	Louis Hostin; France	Eugen Deutsch; Germany	Ibrahim Wasif; Egypt
Heavyweight +82.5 kg	Josef Manger; Germany	Václav Pšenička; Czechoslovakia	Arnold Luhaäär; Estonia

== Participating nations ==
A total of 81 weightlifters from 16 nations competed at the Berlin Games:

- Austria (10)
- Republic of China (3)
- Czechoslovakia (6)
- Egypt (8)
- Estonia (4)
- France (8)
- Germany (10)
- Great Britain (5)
- Haiti (1)
- Hungary (2)
- India (1)
- Italy (4)
- Luxembourg (2)
- Sweden (2)
- Switzerland (5)
- United States (10)

== Medal table ==
Rank	Nation	Gold	Silver	Bronze	Total
1	Egypt	2	1	2	5
2	Germany	1	2	2	5
3	Austria	1	0	0	1
3	France	1	0	0	1
3	United States	1	0	0	1
6	Czechoslovakia	0	1	0	1
7	Estonia	0	0	1	1
Totals (7 entries)		6	4	5	15

== Sources ==
- "Olympic Medal Winners". International Olympic Committee.
- "Ron Walker - 1936 Olympian". YNEPF.
