= Own Kongding =

Chinese weightlifter

Personal information
- Nationality: Chinese
- Born: 27 November 1913

Sport
- Sport: Weightlifting

Own Kongding (born 27 November 1913, date of death unknown) was a Chinese weightlifter. He competed in the men's lightweight event at the 1936 Summer Olympics.
