= Rudolf Troppert =

Austrian weightlifter

Personal information
- Nationality: Austrian
- Born: 26 March 1909; Vienna, Austria-Hungary
- Died: 8 February 1999 (aged 89); Vienna, Austria

Sport
- Sport: Weightlifting

Rudolf Troppert (26 March 1909 – 8 February 1999) was an Austrian weightlifter. He competed in the men's lightweight event at the 1936 Summer Olympics.
