= Walter Zagurski =

American weightlifter (1911–1959)

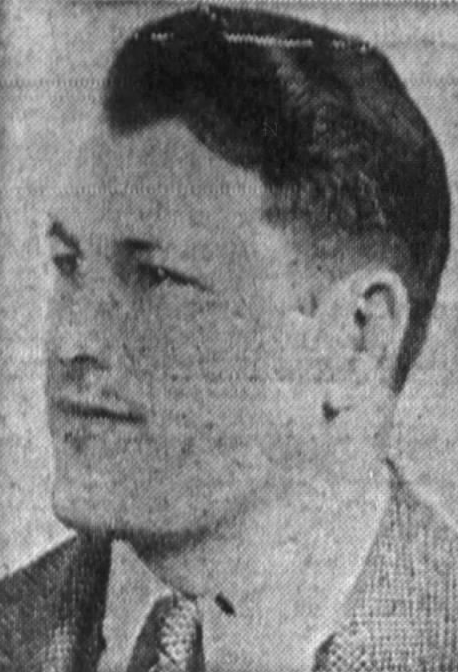
- Born: January 12, 1911; Lithuania
- Died: February 27, 1959 (aged 48); York, Pennsylvania, U.S.
- Occupation: Weightlifter
- Spouse: Ruth Perago Zagurski

Walter J. Zagurski (January 12, 1911 – February 27, 1959) was a Lithuanian-born American weightlifter who competed in the 1932 Summer Olympics. In 1932 he finished sixth in the lightweight class. He was the founding editor of Strength & Health, and he was on the cover of its December 1932 issue. He was active in the York Barbell Club in York, Pennsylvania. Zagurski married Ruth Vanetta Perago (1915–1978) in 1939, and they had four children.
