= Karl Oole =

Estonian weightlifter

Personal information
- Nationality: Estonian
- Born: 26 January 1907; Roela, Estonia
- Died: 21 February 1961 (aged 54); Tallinn, Estonia

Sport
- Sport: Weightlifting

Karl Oole (26 January 1907 – 21 February 1961) was an Estonian weightlifter. He competed in the men's light heavyweight event at the 1936 Summer Olympics.
