= Antonín Balda =

Czech weightlifter

Personal information
- Nationality: Czech
- Born: 6 February 1910

Sport
- Country: Czechoslovakia
- Sport: Weightlifting

Antonín Balda (born 6 February 1910, date of death unknown) was a Czech weightlifter. He competed for Czechoslovakia in the men's lightweight event at the 1936 Summer Olympics.
