= El-Sayed Ibrahim Masoud =

Egyptian weightlifter (born 1914)

Personal information
- Nationality: Egyptian
- Born: 15 November 1914; Alexandria, Egypt

Sport
- Sport: Weightlifting

El-Sayed Ibrahim Masoud (born 15 November 1914, date of death unknown) was an Egyptian weightlifter. He competed in the men's lightweight event at the 1936 Summer Olympics.
