= Helmut Opschruf =

German weightlifter

Personal information
- Nationality: German
- Born: 21 June 1909; Trier, Germany
- Died: 30 March 1992 (aged 82); Trier, Germany

Sport
- Sport: Weightlifting

Helmut Opschruf (21 June 1909 – 30 March 1992) was a German weightlifter. He competed in the men's light heavyweight event at the 1936 Summer Olympics.
