= John Miller (weightlifter) =

American weightlifter (1909–1983)

Personal information
- Born: July 8, 1909 Parkesburg, Pennsylvania, United States
- Died: April 1983 Lancaster, Pennsylvania, United States

Sport
- Sport: Weightlifting

John Miller (July 8, 1909 – April 1983) was an American weightlifter. He competed in the men's light heavyweight event at the 1936 Summer Olympics.
