= Pierre Cottier =

Swiss weightlifter

Personal information
- Nationality: Swiss
- Born: 14 May 1908; Paris, France
- Died: 11 April 1998 (aged 89); Paris, France

Sport
- Sport: Weightlifting

Pierre Cottier (14 May 1908 – 11 April 1998) was a Swiss weightlifter. He competed in the men's light heavyweight event at the 1936 Summer Olympics.
