= Jens Björklund =

Swedish weightlifter (1910–2000)

Personal information
- Nationality: Swedish
- Born: 30 December 1910 Västerås, Sweden
- Died: 10 January 2000 (aged 89) Västerås, Sweden

Sport
- Sport: Weightlifting

Jens Björklund (30 December 1910 – 10 January 2000) was a Swedish weightlifter. He competed in the men's lightweight event at the 1936 Summer Olympics.
