= Fernand Arnout =

French weightlifter (1899–1974)

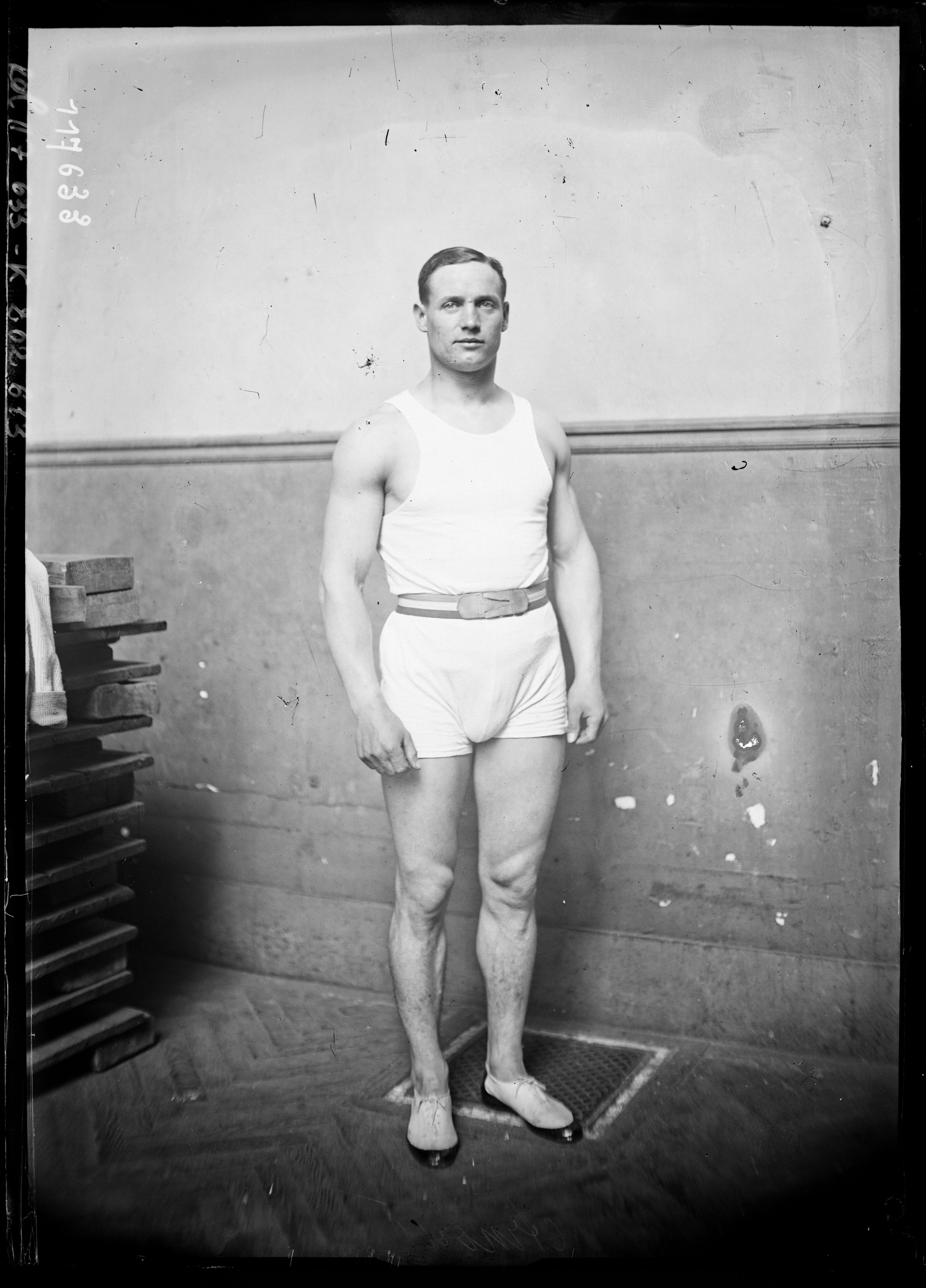

Personal information
- Full name: Fernand Clément Arnout
- Born: 8 December 1899 18th arrondissement, Paris, France
- Died: 30 January 1974 (aged 74) 10th arrondissement, Paris, France

Sport
- Sport: Weightlifting
Medal record
Men's weightlifting
Representing France
Olympic Games
Bronze medal – third place	1928 Amsterdam	-67.5 kg

Fernand Clément Arnout (8 December 1899 – 30 January 1974) was a French weightlifter. Domestically, he would represent Société Athlétique Montmartroise. He would then first compete in his first Olympic Games at the 1920 Summer Olympics, competing in the men's lightweight class. There, he would place equal fifth.

From 1926 to 1928, he would set three world records in weightlifting. He would then compete at the 1928 Summer Olympics, again in the men's lightweight class. He would place third and earn the bronze medal.

== Biography ==
Fernand Clément Arnout was born on 8 December 1999 in the 18th arrondissement of Paris. Domestically, he would represent the sports club Société Athlétique Montmartroise.

He would first represent France at the 1920 Summer Olympics in Antwerp, Belgium. He would compete in the men's lightweight class for lifters that weighed 67.5 kilograms or less. He would compete against 11 other lifters in the competition on 29 August. There, he would lift a toal of 220 kilograms and place equal fifth with Martin Olofsson of Sweden. After the games starting 1926 until 1928, he would set two world records in the snatch and one in the clean and jerk.

He would compete in his second Olympic Games eight years later, competing at the 1928 Summer Olympics in Amsterdam, the Netherlands. There, he would compete again in the men's lightweight class against 17 other lifters from 28 to 29 July. He would lift a total of 302.5 kilograms and place third, earning the bronze.

Arnout later died on 30 January 1974 in the 10th arrondissement of Paris.
