= Helge Sjögren =

Swedish weightlifter

Personal information
- Nationality: Swedish
- Born: 25 December 1902; Norrköping, Sweden
- Died: 31 October 1959 (aged 56); Norrköping, Sweden

Sport
- Sport: Weightlifting

Helge Sjögren (25 December 1902 – 31 October 1959) was a Swedish weightlifter. He competed in the men's lightweight event at the 1928 Summer Olympics.
