= Alfred Griffin =

British weightlifter

Personal information
- Nationality: British
- Born: 31 May 1909; Shoreditch, Greater London, England
- Died: 3 November 1963 (aged 54); Dagenham, Greater London, England

Sport
- Sport: Weightlifting

Alfred Griffin (31 May 1909 – 3 November 1963) was a British weightlifter. He competed in the men's lightweight event at the 1936 Summer Olympics.
