= Henri Blanc =

Swiss weightlifter

Personal information
- Nationality: Swiss
- Born: 3 February 1907

Sport
- Sport: Weightlifting

Henri Blanc (born 3 February 1907, date of death unknown) was a Swiss weightlifter. He competed in the men's lightweight event at the 1936 Summer Olympics.
