= Peeter Mürk =

Estonian weightlifter (1911–1974)

Personal information
- Nationality: Estonian
- Born: 22 December 1911 Valga, Estonia
- Died: 29 November 1974 (aged 62) Koluvere, then part of Estonian SSR, Soviet Union

Sport
- Sport: Weightlifting

Peeter Mürk (22 December 1911 – 29 November 1974) was an Estonian weightlifter. He competed in the men's lightweight event at the 1936 Summer Olympics, placing 11th.

Peeter Mürk was born Valga to Peeter Hendrik and Anna Mürk (née Hinn). He was the youngest of two siblings and only son. In 1930, Mürk began training as weightlifter while serving the Valga Unit of the Estonian Defence League, inspired by Alfred Neuland. He graduated from Valga Industrial School in 1932 with a degree in ironworking. He became the Estonian men's national champion eight times: from 1935–38 lightweight champion and from 1939–42 middle lightweight champion and set fourteen Estonian records: five lightweight and nine middle lightweight.

Mürk died in 1974, aged 62, and was buried at Rapla Cemetery.
