= Menotti Pozzacchio =

Luxembourgish weightlifter

Personal information
- Nationality: Luxembourgish
- Born: 9 December 1906; Niederkorn, Luxembourg
- Died: 16 July 1974 (aged 67); Niederkorn, Luxembourg

Sport
- Sport: Weightlifting

Menotti Pozzacchio (9 December 1906 – 16 July 1974) was a Luxembourgish weightlifter. He competed in the men's lightweight event at the 1928 Summer Olympics.
