= Henry Nissen (weightlifter) =

Danish weightlifter (1906–1978)

Personal information
- Nationality: Danish
- Born: 26 November 1906 Aalborg, Denmark
- Died: 14 September 1978 (aged 71) Aalborg, Denmark

Sport
- Sport: Weightlifting

Henry Nissen (26 November 1906 – 14 September 1978) was a Danish weightlifter. He competed in the men's lightweight event at the 1928 Summer Olympics.
