= Johann von Szabados =

Austrian weightlifter

Personal information
- Nationality: Austrian
- Born: 18 December 1906
- Died: 13 January 1995 (aged 88)

Sport
- Sport: Weightlifting

Johann von Szabados (18 December 1906 – 13 January 1995) was an Austrian weightlifter. He competed in the men's light heavyweight event at the 1936 Summer Olympics.
