= Josef Brumlík =

Czech weightlifter

Personal information
- Nationality: Czech
- Born: 19 October 1911

Sport
- Sport: Weightlifting

Josef Brumlík (born 19 October 1911, date of death unknown) was a Czech weightlifter. He competed in the men's light heavyweight event at the 1936 Summer Olympics.
