= Johny Jaminet =

Luxembourgish footballer

Personal information
- Date of birth: 25 April 1930
- Place of birth: Esch-sur-Alzette, Luxembourg
- Date of death: 11 September 1999 (aged 69)
- Place of death: Esch-sur-Alzette, Luxembourg
- Position: Defender

International career
| Years | Team | Apps | (Gls) |
- Luxembourg

Johny Jaminet (25 April 1930 – 11 September 1999) was a Luxembourgish footballer. He competed in the men's tournament at the 1952 Summer Olympics.
