= Willi Reinfrank =

German weightlifter (1903–1943)

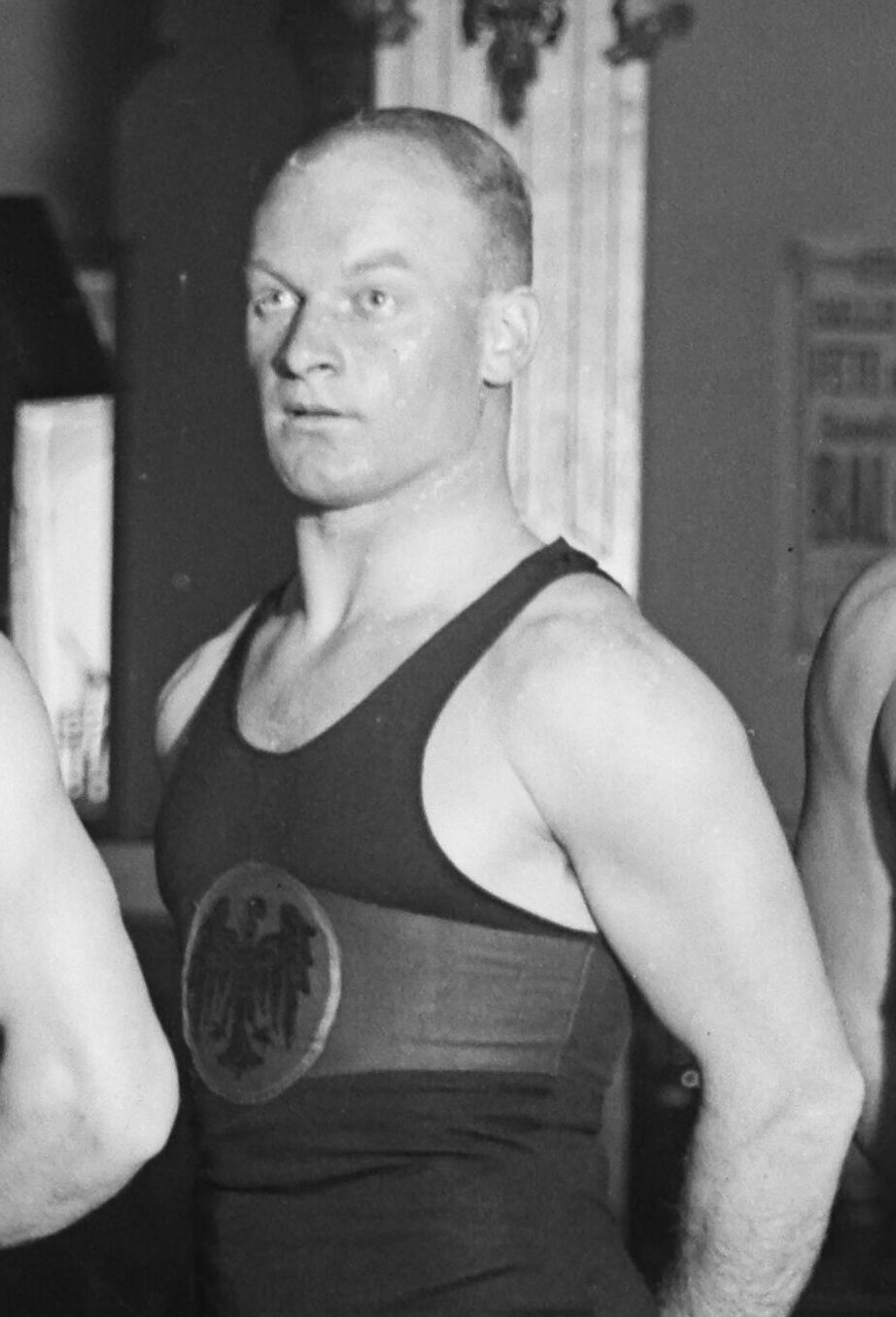
- Willi Reinfrank in 1927

Personal information
- Full name: Hermann Wilhelm "Willi" Reinfrank
- Nationality: German
- Born: 30 May 1903 Mannheim, Germany
- Died: c. 1 January 1943 (aged 39) Volgograd, Soviet Union

Sport
- Sport: Weightlifting
Medal record
Men's weightlifting
Representing Germany
European Championships
Gold medal – first place	1924 Neunkirchen	Lightweight
Silver medal – second place	1929 Vienna	Lightweight

Hermann Wilhelm "Willi" Reinfrank (30 May 1903 – c. 1 January 1943) was a German weightlifter. During his career, he would set eleven world records in the lightweight division. Among his early accomplishments would include him being the 1924 European Weightlifting Champion and the German Champion from 1923 to 1927.

Reinfrank would then represent Germany at the 1928 Summer Olympics in the men's lightweight category. He would place fifth. After the 1928 Summer Games, he would win silver in the same category at the 1929 European Championships and win gold in the middleweight at the 1929 German Championships. He later worked as an auctioneer and was presumed dead after he went missing during the Battle of Stalingrad.

== Biography ==
Hermann Wilhelm "Willi" Reinfrank was born on 30 May 1903 in Mannheim, Germany.

He would place first in the men's lightweight division at the 1924 European Weightlifting Championships in Neunkirchen. During Reinfrank's weightlifting career, he would set eleven world records in the lightweight division. He would set one in the snatch, one in the military press, five in the clean and jerk, and four in the total. From 1923 to 1927, he would win the men's lightweight title at the German Weightlifting Championships.

Reinfrank would then represent Germany at the 1928 Summer Olympics in Amsterdam. There, he would compete in the men's lightweight category for lifters that weighted 67.5 kilograms or less on 28 July. Against 17 other competitors, he would place fifth with a total of 295 kilograms. After the 1928 Summer Games, he would place second in the same category at the 1929 European Weightlifting Championships in Vienna and would place first at the 1929 German Championships in the men's middleweight category.

After his sports career, he was trained as a mechanic but later worked as an auctioneer. He would also fight in World War II and would be reported missing in action on 1 January 1943 during the Battle of Stalingrad in Volgograd. He would eventually be declared dead as of 31 December 1945 in 1955.
