= Karl Jansen =

German weightlifter

Olympic medal record

Men's Weightlifting
Bronze medal – third place	1936 Berlin	-67.5 kg

Karl Jansen (28 May 1908 – 13 November 1961) was a German weightlifter who competed in the 1936 Summer Olympics. He was born in Wanne-Eickel. In 1936 he won the bronze medal in the lightweight class.
