= Robert Fein =

Austrian weightlifter (1907–1975)

- In Austrian team uniform, 1936

Personal information
- National team: Austria
- Born: 9 December 1907 Vienna, Austria-Hungary
- Died: 2 January 1975 (aged 67) Vienna, Austria
- Home town: Vienna, Austria

Sport
- Country: Austria
- Sport: weightlifting
- Weight class: lightweight

Achievements and titles
- Regional finals: European Weightlifting Championships: 1929 gold medal; 1930 bronze medal; 1934 gold medal; 1935 silver medal
- Highest world ranking: 23 world records

Olympic medal record

Representing Austria

Men's Weightlifting

Olympic Games
Gold medal – first place	1936 Berlin	-67.5 kg

World Weightlifting Championships
Silver medal – second place	1937 Paris	-67.5 kg

Robert Fein (9 December 1907 – 2 January 1975) was an Austrian Olympic Champion weightlifter, winning the gold medal in the lightweight class at the 1936 Summer Olympics. The following year, he won the silver medal at the 1937 World Weightlifting Championships, and set his 23rd world record that year. One year later, he was barred from competing in weightlifting, because he was Jewish, and he never competed again.

== Biography ==
Fein was born in Vienna, Austria on 9 December 1907, and was Jewish. He broke world weightlifting records 23 times in total, from 1931 to 1937, when his weightlifting career was abruptly ended by the Austrian authorities.

At the 1929 European weightlifting championships in Vienna, Fein won the gold medal. At the 1930 European weightlifting championships in Munich, he won a bronze medal.

At the 1934 European weightlifting championships in Genoa Fein again won a gold medal, which he shared with 1932 Olympic champion René Duverger. At the 1935 European weightlifting championships in Paris, he won a silver medal.

=== 1936 Olympic gold medal ===
In the event for which he was likely best known, Fein competed in weightlifting at the 1936 Summer Olympics in Berlin, Germany. He won the gold medal in the lightweight class with a world record lift of 342.5 kilograms (755 pounds), with splits of 105+100+137.5, sharing the win with Anwar Mesbah, with whom his match had ended in a tie. Sixteen weightlifters from twelve nations competed. Fein became one of only thirteen Jewish Olympians to medal in the games which were held during Adolf Hitler's Nazi government, and following the imposition of the anti-Semitic Nuremberg laws. The Nuremberg Laws, passed in the fall of 1935, stripped German Jews of citizenship, opportunities to receive a public education, and access to many professions and public facilities. Jewish businesses had been boycotted and Jews could not serve in the legal profession, the civil service, teach in secondary schools or universities or vote or hold public office.

=== Taking Silver in World Championship ===
The Weightlifting World Championships were restored with the 1937 World Weightlifting Championships in Paris, France, the first time they were held since 1923. Fein won a silver medal behind Tony Terlazzo, lifting 355 kilograms (with splits of 107.5+107.5+140), 2.5 kilograms behind Terlazzo.

In 1937, Fein set a world record of 360 kilograms, his last world record before the Austrians banned him from competing.

In 1937 Fein was decorated with the Gold Medal for Service to the Republic of Austria.

=== Barred from competition ===
With the Austrian Anschluß in 1938, Fein was barred from further competition because he was Jewish. He was persecuted during the Austrian Nazi regime.

Dr. George Eisen of Nazareth College included Fein on his list of Jewish Olympic Medalists, and an account of Fein's overcoming an early deficit to earn a tie for the gold medal with Egyptian weightlifter Mesbah is included in Jews and the Olympic Games: the clash between sport and politics: with a complete review of Jewish Olympic medallists.

Fein died at 67 years of age in Vienna, Austria, after a long illness.

== See also ==
- List of select Jewish weightlifters
- List of Olympic medalists in weightlifting
