= Eugen Deutsch =

German weightlifter

Olympic medal record

Men's Weightlifting
Silver medal – second place	1936 Berlin	Men's Light-Heavyweight (-82.5 kg)

Eugen Deutsch (born 9 November 1907 in Ludwigshafen, Rheinland-Pfalz, Germany, killed 8 February 1945 (aged 37) in Großsteinhausen, Rheinland-Pfalz, Germany) was a German weightlifter. He competed in the 1936 Summer Olympics, where he won a silver medal in light-heavyweight category. He lifted a total of 365 kg (clean and press - 105 kg, snatch - 110 kg, clean & jerk - 150 kg) at bodyweight of 81 kg.

He set one light-heavyweight press world record in 1934. He was a member of the club SC Augusta Augsburg from Augsburg. He was killed in action during World War II.
