= Hans Haas =

Austrian weightlifter (1906–1973)

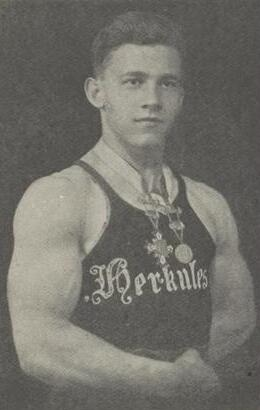
- Hans Haas in 1928

Personal information
- Born: 17 October 1906 Vienna, Austria
- Died: 14 May 1973 (aged 66) Vienna, Austria

Sport
- Sport: Weightlifting
Medal record
Representing Austria
Olympic Games
Gold medal – first place	1928 Amsterdam	-67.5 kg
Silver medal – second place	1932 Los Angeles	-67.5 kg

Hans Haas (17 October 1906 – 14 May 1973) was an Austrian Jewish weightlifter who competed in the 1928 Summer Olympics and in the 1932 Summer Olympics. He was born in Vienna.

In 1926, he became the Austrian champion for the first time and then in 1928 he won the Olympic gold medal in the lightweight class. Four years later at the 1932 Olympic Games he won the silver medal in the lightweight class. Dr. George Eisen of Nazareth College included Haas on his list of Jewish Olympic Medalists.

== See also ==
- List of select Jewish weightlifters
