= Ibrahim Wasif =

Egyptian weightlifter

Olympic medal record

Men's Weightlifting
Bronze medal – third place	1936 Berlin	LightHeavyweight

Ibrahim Wasif (Egyptian Arabic: ابراهيم واصف; November 4, 1908 – May 17, 1975) was a Light-Heavyweight (75–82.5 kg) in the Egyptian weightlifting team at the Summer Olympics of 1936 in Berlin. He earned a bronze medal for Egypt after lifting a record of 360 kg. This contributed to Egypt's total of 5 medals won during the 1936 games.

== See also ==
- List of Egyptians
