= Anwar Mesbah =

Egyptian weightlifter (1913–1998)

Personal information
- Native name: انور مصباح
- Born: 8 April 1913 Alexandria, Egypt
- Died: 25 November 1998 (aged 85) Egypt

Sport
- Sport: Weightlifting
Medal record
Representing Egypt
Olympic Games
Gold medal – first place	1936 Berlin	Lightweight

Anwar Mesbah (Egyptian Arabic: انور مصباح; April 8, 1913 – November 25, 1998) was an Egyptian weightlifter.

He competed at the 1936 Summer Olympics, held in Berlin.

Along with his compatriot weightlifter Khadr El-Touni's middleweight class gold medal, Mesbah won a gold medal for Egypt in the lightweight class, sharing the gold medal with Robert Fein with whom he tied, by lifting a record 342.5 kg.

Born in Alexandria, Mesbah was considered a great athlete of his time.
