= Kurt Helbig =

German weightlifter

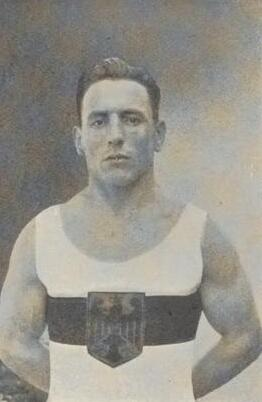
- Kurt Helbig in 1928

Personal information
- Born: 28 June 1901 Plauen, Germany
- Died: 30 January 1975 (aged 73) Plauen, Germany

Sport
- Sport: Weightlifting
Medal record
Representing Germany
Olympic Games
Gold medal – first place	1928 Amsterdam	-67.5 kg

Kurt Helbig (June 28, 1901, in Plauen – January 30, 1975, in Plauen) was a German Olympic champion weightlifter.

He competed in the 1928 Summer Olympics and won the gold medal in the lightweight class (Weightlifting at the 1928 Summer Olympics – Men's 67.5 kg).
