= Nic Scheitler =

Luxembourgish weightlifter

Personal information
- Nationality: Luxembourgish
- Born: 18 May 1910 Niederkorn, Luxembourg
- Died: 18 September 1999 (aged 89) Niederkorn, Luxembourg

Sport
- Sport: Weightlifting

Nic Scheitler (18 May 1910 – 18 September 1999) was a Luxembourgish weightlifter. He competed at the 1928 Summer Olympics and the 1936 Summer Olympics.
