= Gastone Pierini =

Italian weightlifter (1899–1967)

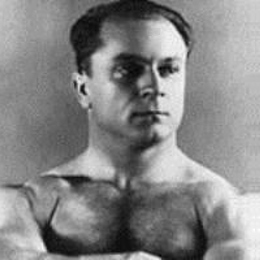

Personal information
- Born: 27 September 1899 Ancona, Italy
- Died: 17 September 1967 (aged 67) Brazil

Sport
- Sport: Weightlifting
Medal record
Representing Italy
Olympic Games
Bronze medal – third place	1932 Los Angeles	-67.5 kg

Gastone Pierini (27 September 1899 – 17 September 1967) was an Italian lightweight weightlifter. He competed in the 1924, 1928, 1932 and 1936 Summer Olympics and won a bronze medal in 1932. He was born in Italy, but lived most of his life in Egypt, and spent five years in a war camp near El-Fayid during World War II. After that he immigrated to Brazil, where he died in 1967.
