= René Duverger =

French weightlifter (1911–1983)

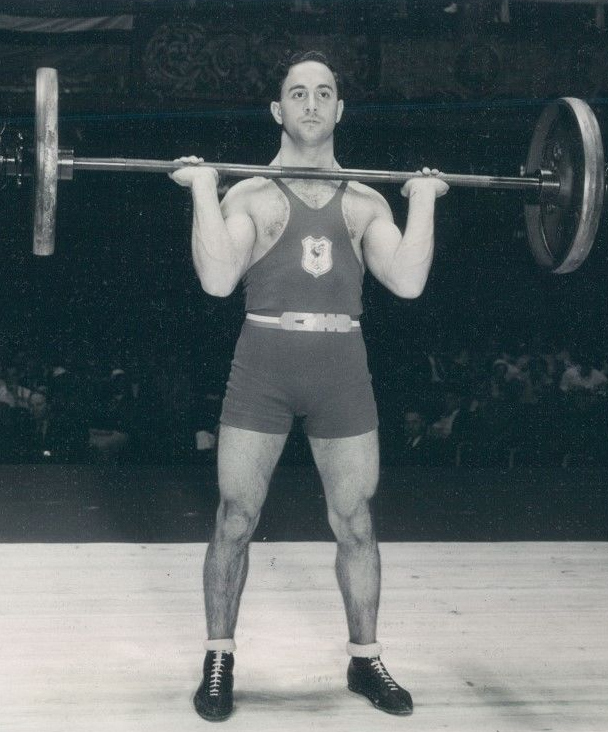
- René Duverger in 1932

Personal information
- Born: 30 January 1911 Paris, France
- Died: 16 August 1983 (aged 72) Caen, Calvados, France
- Height: 1.64 m (5 ft 5 in)
- Weight: 67 kg (148 lb)

Sport
- Sport: Weightlifting
- Club: SA Montmartroise, Paris
Medal record
Representing France
Olympic Games
Gold medal – first place	1932 Los Angeles	-67.5 kg

René Duverger (30 January 1911 – 16 August 1983) was a French weightlifter who won a gold medal in the 67.5 kg category at the 1932 Summer Olympics in Los Angeles. Upon retiring from competitive weightlifting, he was appointed Secretary of the Weightlifting Federation of France.
