= Weightlifting at the 1924 Summer Olympics – Men's 75 kg =

Men's middleweight weightlifting at the Games of the VIII Olympiad
- Venue: Olympisch Stadion
- Date: 23 July
- Competitors: 25 from 13 nations

Medalists
1st place, gold medalist(s)		Carlo Galimberti	Italy
2nd place, silver medalist(s)		Alfred Neuland	Estonia
3rd place, bronze medalist(s)		Jaan Kikkas	Estonia

The men's middleweight event was part of the weightlifting programme at the 1924 Summer Olympics in Paris. The weight class was the third-lightest contested, and allowed weightlifters of up to 75 kilograms (165 pounds). The competition was held on Wednesday, 23 July 1924.

== Results ==
One hand snatch

Place	Weightlifter	Body weight	one hand snatch		
Place	Weightlifter	Body weight	1.	2.	3.
1	Alfred Neuland (EST)	73.5	75	80	82.5
2	Léon Vandeputte (FRA)	70.2	72.5	X (77.5)	77.5
3	Carlo Galimberti (ITA)	73.5	72.5	77.5	X (80)
4	Pierre Vibert (FRA)	71.5	65	70	72.5
5	Hamad Samy (EGY)	74.0	65	70	72.5
6	Jaan Kikkas (EST)	72.5	65	X (70)	70
7	Roger François (FRA)	73.3	65	70	X (75)
8	Albert Aeschmann (SUI)	73.0	X (67.5)	X (67.5)	67.5
9	Alberts Ozoliņš (LAT)	74.9	67.5	X (72.5)	X (72.5)
10	Rupert Eidler (AUT)	73.0	60	65	X (70)
11	Charles Attenborough (GBR)	73.8	60	X (65)	65
12	Enrico Pucci (ITA)	74.3	60	X (65)	65
13	Dante Figoli (ITA)	74.6	60	65	X (67.5)
14	Alfredo Pianta (ARG)	71.5	60	62.5	X (67.5)
15	Rudolf Edinger (AUT)	72.1	X (62.5)	62.5	X (67.5)
16	Nils Lidman (SWE)	72.2	57.5	X (62.5)	62.5
17	Ángel Rovere (ARG)	73.0	X (62.5)	X (62.5)	62.5
18	V. Van Hamme (BEL)	71.0	60	X (65)	X (65)
19	M. Van der Goten (BEL)	72.0	60	X (65)	X (65)
20	Josef Tomáš (TCH)	72.5	X (60)	60	X (65)
21	Michel Mertens (LUX)	73.0	60	X (65)	X (65)
22	Josef Gill (AUT)	74.0	X (60)	60	X (65)
23	Jack Austin (GBR)	71.2	50	X (55)	55
24	Nicolas Horsch (BEL)	73.7	X (55)	55	X (60)
25	Robert Lowes (GBR)	72.5	X (50)	50	X (55)

One hand clean & jerk

Place	Weightlifter	Body weight	one hand snatch	one hand clean & jerk			Total
Place	Weightlifter	Body weight	one hand snatch	1.	2.	3.	Total
1	Alfred Neuland (EST)	73.5	82.5	90	X (95)	X (95)	172.5
1	Carlo Galimberti (ITA)	73.5	77.5	87.5	92.5	95	172.5
3	Léon Vandeputte (FRA)	70.2	77.5	X (85)	X (85)	85	162.5
4	Jaan Kikkas (EST)	72.5	70	80	85	87.5	157.5
5	Albert Aeschmann (SUI)	73.0	67.5	X (82.5)	82.5	87.5	155
5	Rupert Eidler (AUT)	73.0	65	80	90	X (92.5)	155
7	Roger François (FRA)	73.3	70	75	80	X (82.5)	150
8	Hamad Samy (EGY)	74.0	72.5	72.5	77.5	X (82.5)	150
9	Alberts Ozoliņš (LAT)	74.9	67.5	X (82.5)	82.5	X (87.5)	150
10	Pierre Vibert (FRA)	71.5	72.5	70	X (75)	75	147.5
11	Josef Gill (AUT)	74.0	60	77.5	85	X (90)	145
12	Alfredo Pianta (ARG)	71.5	62.5	X (75)	75	80	142.5
13	Enrico Pucci (ITA)	74.3	65	72.5	X (77.5)	77.5	142.5
14	Dante Figoli (ITA)	74.6	65	X (72.5)	72.5	77.5	142.5
15	Nils Lidman (SWE)	72.2	62.5	70	75	X (80)	137.5
16	V. Van Hamme (BEL)	71.0	60	75	X (80)	X (80)	135
17	M. Van der Goten (BEL)	72.0	60	75	X (80)	X (80)	135
18	Ángel Rovere (ARG)	73.0	62.5	72.5	X (77.5)	X (77.5)	135
19	Josef Tomáš (TCH)	72.5	60	72.5	X (77.5)	X (77.5)	132.5
20	Michel Mertens (LUX)	73.0	60	70	X (75)	X (75)	130
21	Charles Attenborough (GBR)	73.8	65	X (65)	X (65)	65	130
22	Jack Austin (GBR)	71.2	55	60	65	70	125
23	Nicolas Horsch (BEL)	73.7	55	67.5	X (72.5)	X (72.5)	122.5
24	Robert Lowes (GBR)	72.5	50	X (62.5)	62.5	65	115
25	Rudolf Edinger (AUT)	72.1	62.5	X (85)	X (85)	X (85)	62.5

Press

Place	Weightlifter	Body weight	one hand snatch	one hand clean & jerk	Press			Total
Place	Weightlifter	Body weight	one hand snatch	one hand clean & jerk	1.	2.	3.	Total
1	Carlo Galimberti (ITA)	73.5	77.5	95	90	95	97.5	270
2	Alfred Neuland (EST)	73.5	82.5	90	72.5	77.5	X (80)	250
3	Hamad Samy (EGY)	74.0	72.5	77.5	92.5	X (97.5)	97.5	247.5
4	Jaan Kikkas (EST)	72.5	70	87.5	75	X (80)	80	237.5
5	Albert Aeschmann (SUI)	73.0	67.5	87.5	82.5	X (87.5)	X (87.5)	237.5
5	Rupert Eidler (AUT)	73.0	65	90	77.5	82.5	X (85)	237.5
7	Roger François (FRA)	73.3	70	80	87.5	X (92.5)	-	237.5
8	Josef Gill (AUT)	74.0	60	85	77.5	82.5	85	230
9	Pierre Vibert (FRA)	71.5	72.5	75	80	X (85)	-	227.5
10	Alberts Ozoliņš (LAT)	74.9	67.5	82.5	77.5	X (82.5)	X (82.5)	227.5
11	Dante Figoli (ITA)	74.6	65	77.5	75	80	82.5	225
12	Alfredo Pianta (ARG)	71.5	62.5	80	70	X (75)	75	217.5
13	Enrico Pucci (ITA)	74.3	65	77.5	70	75	X (77.5)	217.5
14	Josef Tomáš (TCH)	72.5	60	72.5	X (80)	X (80)	80	212.5
15	Michel Mertens (LUX)	73.0	60	70	75	X (80)	80	210
16	Charles Attenborough (GBR)	73.8	65	65	75	80	X (82.5)	210
17	M. Van der Goten (BEL)	72.0	60	75	72.5	X (77.5)	X (77.5)	207.5
18	Ángel Rovere (ARG)	73.0	62.5	72.5	67.5	72.5	X (75)	207.5
19	V. Van Hamme (BEL)	71.0	60	75	X (70)	70	X (75)	205
20	Nils Lidman (SWE)	72.2	62.5	75	65	X (70)	X (70)	202.5
21	Nicolas Horsch (BEL)	73.7	55	67.5	77.5	X (82.5)	X (82.5)	200
22	Jack Austin (GBR)	71.2	55	70	60	-	X (62.5)	185
23	Robert Lowes (GBR)	72.5	50	65	X (65)	65	70	185
24	Léon Vandeputte (FRA)	70.2	77.5	85	X (77.5)	X (77.5)	X (77.5)	162.5
25	Rudolf Edinger (AUT)	72.1	62.5	NM	85	95	X (97.5)	157.5

Two hand snatch

Place	Weightlifter	Body weight	one hand snatch	one hand clean & jerk	Press	Snatch			Total
Place	Weightlifter	Body weight	one hand snatch	one hand clean & jerk	Press	1.	2.	3.	Total
1	Carlo Galimberti (ITA)	73.5	77.5	95	97.5	87.5	92.5	95	365
2	Alfred Neuland (EST)	73.5	82.5	90	77.5	90	X (95)	X (100)	340
3	Hamad Samy (EGY)	74.0	72.5	77.5	97.5	80	85	X (87.5)	332.5
4	Jaan Kikkas (EST)	72.5	70	87.5	80	X (85)	85	X (90)	322.5
5	Albert Aeschmann (SUI)	73.0	67.5	87.5	82.5	82.5	87.5	X (90)	325
6	Roger François (FRA)	73.3	70	80	87.5	82.5	87.5	X (90)	325
7	Rupert Eidler (AUT)	73.0	65	90	82.5	80	85	X (87.5)	322.5
8	Pierre Vibert (FRA)	71.5	72.5	75	80	X (85)	85	X (87.5)	312.5
9	Josef Gill (AUT)	74.0	60	85	85	75	X (80)	80	310
10	Dante Figoli (ITA)	74.6	65	77.5	82.5	72.5	77.5	X (80)	302.5
11	Alfredo Pianta (ARG)	71.5	62.5	80	75	80	X (85)	X (85)	297.5
12	M. Van der Goten (BEL)	72.0	60	75	72.5	80	85	X (90)	292.5
13	Ángel Rovere (ARG)	73.0	62.5	72.5	72.5	80	85	X (87.5)	292.5
14	Enrico Pucci (ITA)	74.3	65	77.5	75	70	75	X (77.5)	292.5
15	Michel Mertens (LUX)	73.0	60	70	80	75	X (80)	X (80)	285
16	Charles Attenborough (GBR)	73.8	65	65	80	70	75	X (80)	285
17	Josef Tomáš (TCH)	72.5	60	72.5	80	70	X (75)	X (75)	282.5
18	V. Van Hamme (BEL)	71.0	60	75	70	75	X (80)	X (80)	280
19	Nicolas Horsch (BEL)	73.7	55	67.5	77.5	X (77.5)	77.5	80	280
20	Nils Lidman (SWE)	72.2	62.5	75	65	75	X (80)	X (80)	277.5
21	Jack Austin (GBR)	71.2	55	70	60	70	X (75)	75	260
22	Robert Lowes (GBR)	72.5	50	65	70	65	70	X (75)	255
23	Léon Vandeputte (FRA)	70.2	77.5	85	NM	90	X (95)	X (95)	252.5
24	Rudolf Edinger (AUT)	72.1	62.5	NM	95	80	X (90)	X (90)	237.5
25	Alberts Ozoliņš (LAT)	74.9	67.5	82.5	77.5	X (90)	X (95)	X (95)	227.5

Two hand clean & jerk

Final standing after the last event:

Place	Weightlifter	Body weight	one hand snatch	one hand clean & jerk	Press	Snatch	Clean & jerk			Total
Place	Weightlifter	Body weight	one hand snatch	one hand clean & jerk	Press	Snatch	1.	2.	3.	Total
1	Carlo Galimberti (ITA)	73.5	77.5	95	97.5	95	122.5	127.5	X (130)	492.5
2	Alfred Neuland (EST)	73.5	82.5	90	77.5	90	100	115	X (125)	455
3	Jaan Kikkas (EST)	72.5	70	87.5	80	85	115	120	127.5	450
4	Hamad Samy (EGY)	74.0	72.5	77.5	97.5	85	110	115	X (120)	447.5
5	Albert Aeschmann (SUI)	73.0	67.5	87.5	82.5	87.5	X (112.5)	112.5	117.5	442.5
6	Roger François (FRA)	73.3	70	80	87.5	87.5	107.5	112.5	117.5	442.5
7	Rupert Eidler (AUT)	73.0	65	90	82.5	85	110	115	X (120)	437.5
8	Pierre Vibert (FRA)	71.5	72.5	75	80	85	110	115	X (120)	427.5
9	Johann Gill (AUT)	74.0	60	85	85	80	X (110)	110	X (120)	420
10	Dante Figoli (ITA)	74.6	65	77.5	82.5	77.5	105	X (110)	X (110)	407.5
11	Ángel Rovere (ARG)	73.0	62.5	72.5	72.5	85	105	110	112.5	405
12	Alfredo Pianta (ARG)	71.5	62.5	80	75	80	100	105	X (110)	402.5
13	Marcel Van Der Goten (BEL)	72.0	60	75	72.5	85	105	110	X (115)	402.5
14	Enrico Pucci (ITA)	74.3	65	77.5	75	75	100	105	X (110)	397.5
15	Josef Tomáš (TCH)	72.5	60	72.5	80	70	X (110)	110	X (115)	392.5
16	V. Van Hamme (BEL)	71.0	60	75	70	75	105	110	X (112.5)	390
17	Charles Attenborough (GBR)	73.8	65	65	80	75	95	100	102.5	387.5
18	Nils Lidman (SWE)	72.2	62.5	75	65	75	X (100)	100	105	382.5
19	Michel Mertens (LUX)	73.0	60	70	80	75	95	X (100)	X (102.5)	380
20	Nicolas Horsch (BEL)	73.7	55	67.5	77.5	80	X (100)	100	X (105)	380
21	Léon Vandeputte (FRA)	70.2	77.5	85	NM	90	120	X (125)	X (125)	372.5
22	Jack Austin (GBR)	71.2	55	70	60	75	95	100	X (105)	360
22	Robert Lowes (GBR)	72.5	50	65	70	70	95	X (100)	X (100)	350
24	Rudolf Edinger (AUT)	72.1	62.5	NM	95	80	X (110)	110	X (120)	347.5
25	Alberts Ozoliņš (LAT)	74.9	67.5	82.5	77.5	NM	112.5	X (117.5)	X (117.5)	340

== Sources ==
- official report
- Wudarski, Pawel (1999). "Wyniki Igrzysk Olimpijskich" (in Polish).
