= Brazil at the 1924 Summer Olympics =

- IOC code: BRA
- NOC: Brazilian Sports Confederation

in Paris
- Competitors: 12 (12 men) in 4 sports
- Flag bearer: Alfredo Gomes
- Medals: Gold 0 Silver 0 Bronze 0 Total 0

Summer Olympics appearances (overview)
- 1920; 1924; 1928; 1932; 1936; 1948; 1952; 1956; 1960; 1964; 1968; 1972; 1976; 1980; 1984; 1988; 1992; 1996; 2000; 2004; 2008; 2012; 2016; 2020; 2024; 2028

Brazil was represented at the 1924 Summer Olympics in Paris, France by the Brazilian Sports Confederation.

In total, 12 athletes – all men – represented Brazil in four different sports including art, athletics, rowing and shooting.

== Background ==
The Brazilian Sports Confederation was formed in 1914 and became affiliated with the Olympics (the Brazilian Olympic Committee would later become recognised by the International Olympic Committee (IOC) in 1935). After World War I, Brazil made its Olympic debut at the 1920 Summer Olympics in Antwerp, Belgium. A delegation of 19 athletes was sent to the games and they were relatively successful with Brazil winning three medals – one gold, one silver and one bronze.

== Competitors ==
In total, 12 athletes represented Brazil at the 1924 Summer Olympics in Paris, France across four different sports.

Sport	Men	Women	Total
Art	1	0	1
Athletics	8	0	8
Rowing	2	0	2
Shooting	1	0	1
Total	12	0	12

== Art ==
In total, one Brazilian athlete participated in the art competitions – L. Alvar da Silva in the literature category.

== Athletics ==
In total, eight Brazilian athletes participated in the athletics events – Alvaro de Oliveira Ribeiro in the men's 100 m and the men's 200 m, Narciso Costa in the men's 400 m and the men's 800 m, Alfredo Gomes in the men's 5,000 m and the men's individual cross country, Alberto Byington in the men's 110 m hurdles, José Galimberti in the men's shot put and the men's discus throw, Octávio Zani in the men's shot put, the men's discus throw and the Hammer throw, Willy Seewald in the men's javelin throw and Eurico de Freitas in the men's pole vault.

Athlete	Event	Heats		Quarterfinals		Semifinals		Final	
Athlete	Event	Result	Rank	Result	Rank	Result	Rank	Result	Rank
Alvaro de Oliveira Ribeiro	100 m	Unknown	5	did not advance					
Alvaro de Oliveira Ribeiro	200 m	Unknown	3	did not advance					
Narciso Costa	400 m	Unknown	3	did not advance					
Narciso Costa	800 m	N/A		Unknown	6	did not advance			
Alfredo Gomes	5,000 m	N/A				Unknown	9	did not advance	
Alfredo Gomes	Individual cross country	N/A						did not finish	
Alberto Byington	110 m hurdles	N/A		Unknown	5	did not advance			
José Galimberti	Shot put	N/A				11.30	9	did not advance	
José Galimberti	Discus throw	N/A				36.52	7	did not advance	
Octávio Zani	Shot put	N/A				No mark	8	did not advance	
Octávio Zani	Discus throw	N/A				35.72	10	did not advance	
Octávio Zani	Hammer throw	N/A				33.895	13	did not advance	
Willy Seewald	Javelin throw	N/A				49.39	9	did not advance	
Eurico de Freitas	Pole vault	N/A				3.40	5	did not advance	

== Rowing ==
In total, two Brazilian athletes participated in the rowing events – Carlos Castello and Edmundo Castello in the men's double sculls.

Rower	Event	Semifinals		Repechage		Final	
Rower	Event	Result	Rank	Result	Rank	Result	Rank
Carlos Castello; Edmundo Castello	Double sculls	Unknown	2 Q	N/A		Unknown	4

== Shooting ==
In total, one Brazilian athlete participated in the shooting events – José Macedo in the men's 50 m small-bore rifle.

Shooter	Event	Final	
Shooter	Event	Score	Rank
José Macedo	50 m small-bore rifle	380	38
