= Weightlifting at the 1928 Summer Olympics – Men's 75 kg =

Men's middleweight weightlifting at the Games of the IX Olympiad
- Date: 29 July
- Competitors: 23 from 15 nations

Medalists
1st place, gold medalist(s)		Roger François	France
2nd place, silver medalist(s)		Carlo Galimberti	Italy
3rd place, bronze medalist(s)		Guus Scheffer	Netherlands

The men's middleweight event was part of the weightlifting programme at the 1928 Summer Olympics in Amsterdam. The weight class was the third-lightest contested, and allowed weightlifters of up to 75 kilograms (165 pounds). The competition was held on Sunday, 29 July 1928.

== Records ==
These were the standing world and Olympic records (in kilograms) prior to the 1928 Summer Olympics.

World Record	Press	103.5	(France) Roger François	Paris (FRA)	1928
World Record	Snatch	104.5	(Austria) Hans Haas	Vienna (AUT)	1927
World Record	Clean & Jerk	142.5	(Austria) Karl Hipfinger	Vienna (AUT)	1927
World Record	Total	330	(Austria) Karl Hipfinger	Vienna (AUT)	1927
Olympic Record	Press	97.5	(Italy) Carlo Galimberti	Paris (FRA)	23 July 1924
Olympic Record	Press	97.5	(Egypt) Ahmed Samy	Paris (FRA)	23 July 1924
Olympic Record	Snatch	95	(Italy) Carlo Galimberti	Paris (FRA)	23 July 1924
Olympic Record	Clean & Jerk	127.5	(Italy) Carlo Galimberti	Paris (FRA)	23 July 1924
Olympic Record	Clean & Jerk	127.5	(Estonia) Jaan Kikkas	Paris (FRA)	23 July 1924
Olympic Record	Total	320(*)	(Italy) Carlo Galimberti	Paris (FRA)	23 July 1924

(*) Originally a five lift competition.

All four Olympic records were improved in this competition. Carlo Galimberti set a new world record in press with 105 kilograms. Guus Scheffer set a new world record in snatch with 105 kilograms. In the total of the three lifts at first Carlo Galimberti set a new world record with 332.5 kilograms only to be improved by Roger François with 335 kilograms.

== Results ==
Rank	Weightlifter	Nation	Press			Snatch			Clean & jerk			Total
Rank	Weightlifter	Nation	#1	#2	#3	#1	#2	#3	#1	#2	#3	Total
1st place, gold medalist(s)	Roger François	France	92.5	100	102.5	95	100	102.5	125	130	X (135)	335
2nd place, silver medalist(s)	Carlo Galimberti	Italy	97.5	102.5	105	92.5	97.5	X (100)	130	X (135)	X (135)	332.5
3rd place, bronze medalist(s)	Guus Scheffer	Netherlands	92.5	X (97.5)	97.5	95	100	105	X (125)	125	X (130)	327.5
4	Franz Zinner	Germany	82.5	X (87.5)	87.5	100	X (105)	X (105)	125	130	135	322.5
5	Gaston le Pût	France	85	90	92.5	90	X (95)	95	115	120	125	312.5
6	Willi Hoffmann	Germany	85	90	X (92.5)	90	95	X (100)	120	X (127.5)	X (130)	305
7	Hussein Moukhtar	Egypt	90	X (95)	X (95)	92.5	X (97.5)	X (97.5)	120	X (125)	X (125)	302.5
8	Jan Van Rompaey	Belgium	X (77.5)	92.5	X (97.5)	X (82.5)	X (85)	85	X (115)	115	X (120)	292.5
9	Joop Zalm	Netherlands	87.5	92.5	X (95)	X (85)	85	X (90)	X (107.5)	X (107.5)	107.5	285
9	Alfredo Pianta	Argentina	70	X (75)	75	80	85	90	110	115	120	285
11	M. Van der Goten	Belgium	X (77.5)	77.5	X (82.5)	82.5	87.5	X (90)	110	115	X (120)	280
11	Jan Kostrba	Czechoslovakia	75	80	X (85)	80	85	X (90)	110	115	X (120)	280
13	Leonhard Kukk	Estonia	82.5	X (87.5)	X (87.5)	X (85)	X (85)	85	110	X (125)	X (125)	277.5
13	Charles Attenborough	Great Britain	77.5	82.5	87.5	77.5	82.5	85	102.5	107.5	110	277.5
15	Ernst Trinkler	Switzerland	80	X (85)	X (87.5)	80	X (85)	X (85)	110	115	X (120)	275
15	Povilas Vitonis	Lithuania	85	X (90)	X (90)	X (82.5)	X (85)	85	97.5	105	X (107.5)	275
17	Bohumil Sýkora	Czechoslovakia	70	X (75)	X (75)	80	X (85)	85	110	115	X (120)	270
18	John Tooley	Great Britain	70	X (75)	X (75)	77.5	82.5	X (87.5)	105	110	X (115)	262.5
-	Hermann Eichholzer	Switzerland	82.5	87.5	X (90)	90	95	X (100)	X (117.5)	X (117.5)	X (117.5)	-
-	Karl Hipfinger	Austria	82.5	X (87.5)	X (87.5)	95	X (100)	X (100)	X (130)	X (130)	X (130)	-
-	Bertil Carlsson	Sweden	X (77.5)	X (82.5)	82.5	-	-	-	-	-	-	-
-	François Bremer	Luxembourg	X (70)	X (70)	X (70)	-	-	-	-	-	-	-
-	Franz Nitterl	Austria	X (80)	X (80)	X (80)	-	-	-	-	-	-	-

== Sources ==
- Olympic Report
- Wudarski, Pawel (1999). "Wyniki Igrzysk Olimpijskich" (in Polish).
