= Weightlifting at the 1932 Summer Olympics – Men's 75 kg =

Weightlifting at the Olympics

The men's middleweight event was part of the weightlifting programme at the 1932 Summer Olympics in Los Angeles. The weight class was the third-lightest contested, and allowed weightlifters of up to 75 kilograms (165 pounds). The competition was held on Sunday, 31 July 1932. Seven weightlifters from six nations competed.

== Medalists ==
Gold	Silver	Bronze
Rudolf Ismayr; Germany	Carlo Galimberti; Italy	Karl Hipfinger; Austria

== Records ==
These were the standing world and Olympic records (in kilograms) prior to the 1932 Summer Olympics.

World Record	Press	>105.5	?		
World Record	Snatch	>112	(Germany) Rudolf Ismayr		
World Record	Clean & Jerk	145	(Austria) Karl Hipfinger	Vienna (AUT)	1931
World Record	Total	>352	?		
Olympic Record	Press	105	(Italy) Carlo Galimberti	Amsterdam (NED)	29 July 1928
Olympic Record	Snatch	105	(Netherlands) Guus Scheffer	Amsterdam (NED)	29 July 1928
Olympic Record	Clean & Jerk	135	(Germany) Franz Zinner	Amsterdam (NED)	29 July 1928
Olympic Record	Total	335	(France) Roger François	Amsterdam (NED)	29 July 1928

Karl Hipfinger set a new Olympic record in snatch with 107.5 kilograms and in clean and jerk with 140 kilograms. Rudolf Ismayr set a new Olympic record in total with 345 kilograms.

== Results ==
All figures in kilograms.

Place	Weightlifter	Press			Snatch			Clean & jerk			Total
Place	Weightlifter	1.	2.	3.	1.	2.	3.	1.	2.	3.	Total
1	Rudolf Ismayr (GER)	95	102.5	X (107.5)	100	110	X (115)	132.5	X (140)	X (140)	345
2	Carlo Galimberti (ITA)	95	102.5	X (105)	95	102.5	105	127.5	X (132.5)	132.5	340
3	Karl Hipfinger (AUT)	85	90	X (92.5)	100	105	107.5	135	140	X (145)	337.5
4	Roger François (FRA)	95	102.5	X (105)	95	102.5	X (105)	X (125)	125	130	335
5	Stanley Kratkowski (USA)	82.5	X (87.5)	X (87.5)	X (102.5)	102.5	X (110)	120	X (125)	X (125)	305
6	Julio Juaneda (ARG)	70	75	X (80)	85	90	X (95)	115	120	X (125)	285
7	Sam Termine (USA)	82.5	87.5	X (90)	100	105	X (110)	X (132.5)	X (132.5)	X (132.5)	192.5

== Sources ==
- Olympic Report
- Wudarski, Pawel (1999). "Wyniki Igrzysk Olimpijskich" (in Polish).
