= Weightlifting at the 1928 Summer Olympics – Men's 82.5 kg =

Weightlifting at the Olympics

Men's light heavyweight weightlifting at the Games of the IX Olympiad
- Date: 29 July
- Competitors: 15 from 10 nations

Medalists
1st place, gold medalist(s)		El Sayed Nosseir	Egypt
2nd place, silver medalist(s)		Louis Hostin	France
3rd place, bronze medalist(s)		Jan Verheijen	Netherlands

The men's light heavyweight event was part of the weightlifting programme at the 1928 Summer Olympics in Amsterdam. The weight class was the second-heaviest contested, and allowed weightlifters of up to 82.5 kilograms (181.5 pounds). The competition was held on Sunday, 29 July 1928.

== Records ==
These were the standing world and Olympic records (in kilograms) prior to the 1928 Summer Olympics.

World Record	Press		?		
World Record	Snatch	110.5	(Germany) Jakob Vogt	Munich (GER)	1927
World Record	Clean & Jerk		?		
World Record	Total	337.5	(Germany) Jakob Vogt	Koblenz (GER)	1928
Olympic Record	Press	95	(Austria) Leopold Friedrich	Paris (FRA)	23 July 1924
Olympic Record	Snatch	102.5	(France) Charles Rigoulot	Paris (FRA)	23 July 1924
Olympic Record	Clean & Jerk	135	(France) Charles Rigoulot	Paris (FRA)	23 July 1924
Olympic Record	Total	322.5(*)	(France) Charles Rigoulot	Paris (FRA)	23 July 1924

(*) Originally a five lift competition.

All four Olympic records were improved in this competition. El Sayed Nosseir set a new world record in snatch with 112.5 kilograms and in the total of the three lifts with 355 kilograms.

== Results ==
Rank	Weightlifter	Nation	Press			Snatch			Clean & jerk			Total
Rank	Weightlifter	Nation	#1	#2	#3	#1	#2	#3	#1	#2	#3	Total
1st place, gold medalist(s)	El Sayed Nosseir	Egypt	92.5	97.5	100	102.5	107.5	112.5	X (140)	140	142.5	355
2nd place, silver medalist(s)	Louis Hostin	France	95	100	X (102.5)	102.5	107.5	110	132.5	137.5	142.5	352.5
3rd place, bronze medalist(s)	Jan Verheijen	Netherlands	X (90)	X (95)	95	105	X (110)	X (110)	132.5	137.5	X (142.5)	337.5
4	Jakob Vogt	Germany	100	X (102.5)	X (105)	100	X (105)	105	130	X (135)	X (135)	335
4	Václav Pšenička	Czechoslovakia	100	X (105)	X (105)	100	105	X (110)	130	X (135)	X (135)	335
6	Karl Freiberger	Austria	85	90	95	90	95	X (100)	125	X (132.5)	132.5	322.5
7	Pierre Vibert	France	X (95)	95	X (100)	95	X (100)	X (100)	125	X (130)	X (130)	315
7	Josef Zeman	Austria	75	X (80)	X (80)	95	102.5	105	130	135	X (140)	315
7	Karl Bierwirth	Germany	90	95	X (100)	95	X (105)	X (110)	120	125	-	315
10	Otto Garnus	Switzerland	82.5	X (87.5)	X (87.5)	90	95	X (100)	125	130	X (132.5)	307.5
11	Olaf Luiga	Estonia	80	X (85)	X (85)	90	95	X (100)	130	X (135)	X (135)	305
12	Willem Tholen	Netherlands	X (80)	85	87.5	90	X (95)	X (95)	115	120	X (125)	297.5
13	Jules Van Der Goten	Belgium	72.5	77.5	80	85	90	92.5	110	120	X (125)	292.5
14	Nic Scheitler	Luxembourg	80	85	X (90)	80	85	X (92.5)	105	X (110)	-	275
15	Edmond Donzé	Switzerland	75	X (80)	X (80)	77.5	82.5	X (85)	X (100)	100	X (105)	257.5

== Sources ==
- Olympic Report
- Wudarski, Pawel (1999). "Wyniki Igrzysk Olimpijskich" (in Polish).
