= Athletics at the 1924 Summer Olympics – Men's discus throw =

Men's discus throw at the Games of the VIII Olympiad
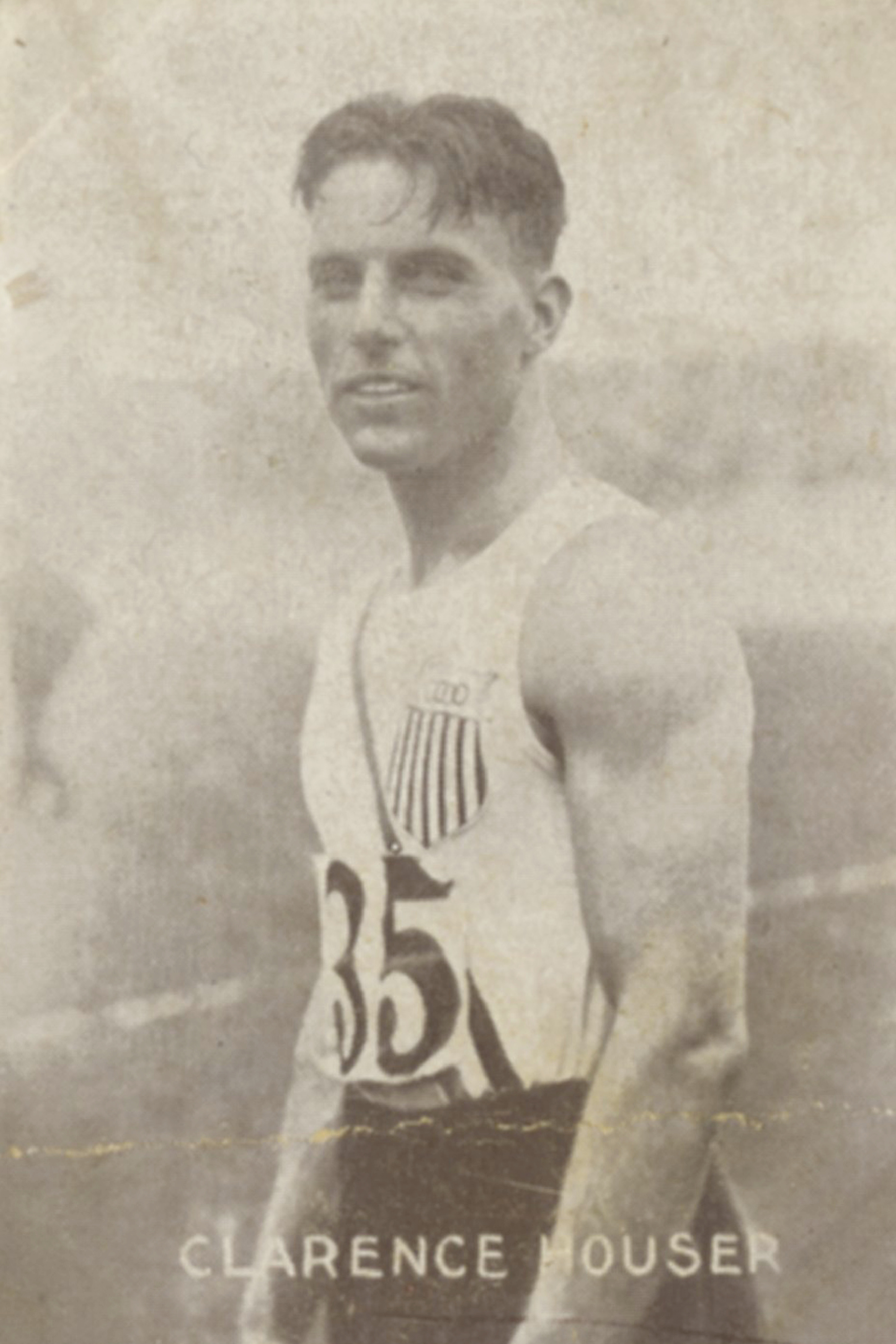
- Bud Houser (1928)
- Venue: Stade Olympique Yves-du-Manoir
- Date: July 13, 1924
- Competitors: 32 from 18 nations
- Winning distance: 46.155 OR

Medalists
1st place, gold medalist(s)		Bud Houser; United States
2nd place, silver medalist(s)		Vilho Niittymaa; Finland
3rd place, bronze medalist(s)		Thomas Lieb; United States

The men's discus throw event was part of the track and field athletics programme at the 1924 Summer Olympics. The competition was held on Sunday, July 13, 1924. 32 discus throwers from 18 nations competed. The maximum number of athletes per nation was four. The event was won by Bud Houser of the United States, the nation's fourth victory in the men's discus throw (and first since 1908); the Americans had medalled in each of the Olympic discus throw events to date. Houser had also won the shot put. Vilho Niittymaa took silver, keeping Finland on the podium in the event for the third straight Games. Thomas Lieb gave the United States its second discus throw medal of 1924, with his bronze.

== Background ==
This was the seventh appearance of the event, which is one of 12 athletics events to have been held at every Summer Olympics. The three medalists from 1920 all returned: gold medalist Elmer Niklander and silver medalist Armas Taipale of Finland, and bronze medalist Gus Pope of the United States.

Brazil, Estonia, Ireland, Latvia, Portugal, Poland, Spain, Switzerland, and Yugoslavia each made their debut in the men's discus throw. The United States made its seventh appearance, having competed in every edition of the Olympic men's discus throw to date.

== Competition format ==
The competition continued to use the single, divided-final format in use since 1896. Each athlete received three throws, with the top six receiving an additional three throws.

== Records ==
These were the standing world and Olympic records (in metres) prior to the 1924 Summer Olympics.

World record	James Duncan (USA)	47.58	New York, United States	27 May 1912
Olympic record	Armas Taipale (FIN)	45.21	Stockholm, Sweden	12 July 1912

In the qualification Bud Houser set a new Olympic record with 46.155 metres.

== Schedule ==
Date	Time	Round
Sunday, 13 July 1924	16:00	Qualifying; Final

== Results ==
The best six throwers, all three groups counted together, qualified for the final. The throwing order and the throwing series are not available. The final was held on the same day. No competitor was able to improve his mark from the qualification.

Rank	Athlete	Nation	Qualifying	Final	Distance	Notes
1st place, gold medalist(s)	Bud Houser	United States	46.155	Unknown	46.155	OR
2nd place, silver medalist(s)	Vilho Niittymaa	Finland	44.95	Unknown	44.95	
3rd place, bronze medalist(s)	Thomas Lieb	United States	44.83	Unknown	44.83	
4	Gus Pope	United States	44.42	Unknown	44.42	
5	Ketil Askildt	Norway	43.405	Unknown	43.405	
6	Glenn Hartranft	United States	42.49	Unknown	42.49	
7	Elmer Niklander	Finland	42.09	Did not advance	42.09	
8	Heikki Malmivirta	Finland	41.16	Did not advance	41.16	
9	Sándor Toldi	Hungary	41.09	Did not advance	41.09	
10	Kálmán Marvalits	Hungary	40.82	Did not advance	40.82	
11	Paddy Bermingham	Ireland	40.42	Did not advance	40.42	
12	Armas Taipale	Finland	40.215	Did not advance	40.215	
13	Karl Jensen	Denmark	39.78	Did not advance	39.78	
14	Paul Béranger	France	38.93	Did not advance	38.93	
15	Gustav Kalkun	Estonia	38.46	Did not advance	38.46	
16	Werner Nüesch	Switzerland	38.205	Did not advance	38.205	
17	Camillo Zemi	Italy	37.465	Did not advance	37.465	
18	Veljko Narančić	Yugoslavia	37.35	Did not advance	37.35	
19	Daniel Pierre	France	37.015	Did not advance	37.015	
20	José Galimberti	Brazil	36.52	Did not advance	36.52	
21	Teodors Sukatnieks	Latvia	35.985	Did not advance	35.985	
22	Arvīds Ķibilds	Latvia	35.79	Did not advance	35.79	
23	Octávio Zani	Brazil	35.72	Did not advance	35.72	
24	Sławosz Szydłowski	Poland	35.71	Did not advance	35.71	
25	Armando Poggioli	Italy	35.29	Did not advance	35.29	
26	Otto Garnus	Switzerland	35.16	Did not advance	35.16	
27	Albino Pighi	Italy	34.985	Did not advance	34.985	
28	Gabino Lizarza	Spain	34.20	Did not advance	34.20	
29	František Janda-Suk	Czechoslovakia	34.08	Did not advance	34.08	
30	Georgios Zacharopoulos	Greece	34.02	Did not advance	34.02	
31	António Martins	Portugal	32.40	Did not advance	32.40	
—	Dimitrios Karabatis	Greece	No mark	Did not advance	No mark	

== Sources ==
- French Olympic Committee (c. 1925). "TITRE III / ATHLÉTISME / ÉPREUVE No 18: LANCEMENT DU DISQUE". In M.A. Avé (ed.). Les Jeux de la VIIIe Olympiade Paris 1924: rapport officiel (PDF) (in French). Paris: Librairie de France. p. 140. Archived from the original (PDF) on 2011-05-05.
- Wudarski, Pawel (1999). "Wyniki Igrzysk Olimpijskich" (in Polish).
