= Hamad Samy =

Egyptian weightlifter

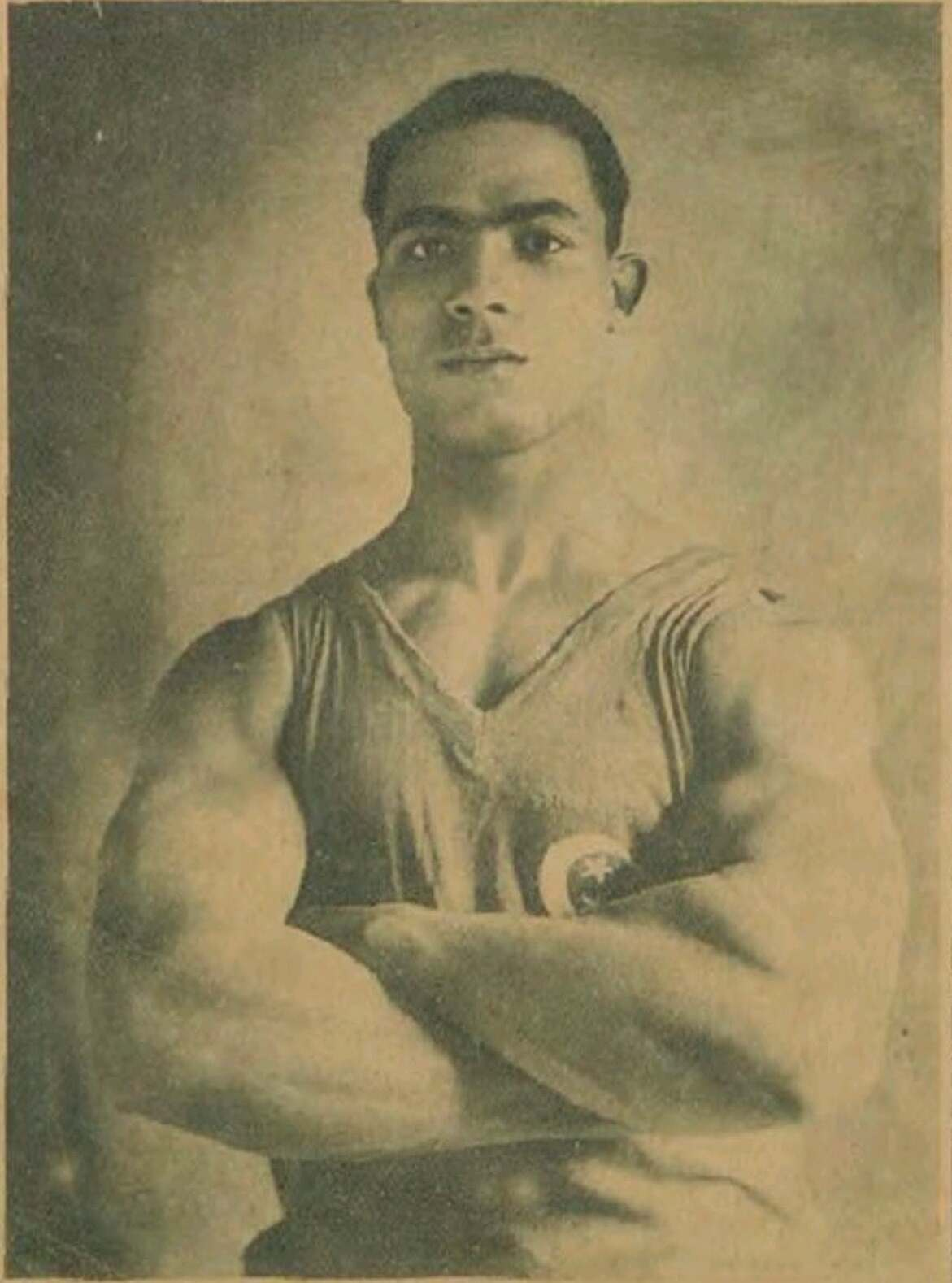

Personal information
- Native name: أحمد سامي
- Full name: Hamad Samy
- Nationality: Egyptian
- Born: 1899 Alexandria, Egypt

Sport
- Sport: Weightlifting

Hamad Samy (Arabic: أحمد سامي; born 1899, date of death unknown) was an Egyptian weightlifter. He would compete for Egypt at the 1920 Summer Olympics and was designated as the flag bearer for Egypt. His event would be the men's middleweight category, though he would only complete one lift and rank unplaced.

Samy would then compete at the 1924 Summer Olympics in the same event. While lifting, he would set a world record in the military press with a weight of 97.5 kilograms. He would place fourth in the event with a total of 447.5 kilograms.

== Biography ==
Hamad Samy was born in 1899 in Alexandria, Egypt. He would compete for Egypt at the 1920 Summer Olympics in Antwerp, Belgium, in the sport of Olympic weightlifting. There, he was designated as the flag bearer for Egypt during the opening ceremony of the games.

Samy would compete in the men's middleweight category for competitors weighing 75 kilograms or below on 30 August. He would be the first weightlifter to represent Egypt at an Olympic Games. There, he would only compete a one-handed snatch of 55 kilograms and would not complete the other lifts in the event. He would be unplaced out of the ten athlete that competed, being one of two athletes without a total combined score.

Four years later, Hamy would compete at the 1924 Summer Olympics in Paris. He again competed in the men's middleweight category, competing on 23 July. His first lift would be a one-handed snatch of 72.5 kilograms, initially placing him fourth in the event. His next lift would be a one-handed clean and jerk of 77.5 kilograms. After that he would lift a military press at 97.5 kilograms, setting a world record alongside Carlo Galimberti of Italy and Rudolf Edinger of Austria. His last lifts of 85 kilograms in the snatch and 115 kilograms in the clean and jerk would complete his lifts in the event. He would have a total of 447.5 kilograms and place fourth in the event out of the 25 weightlifters that competed, missing out on a medal.
