= Bud Houser =

American shot putter and discus thrower

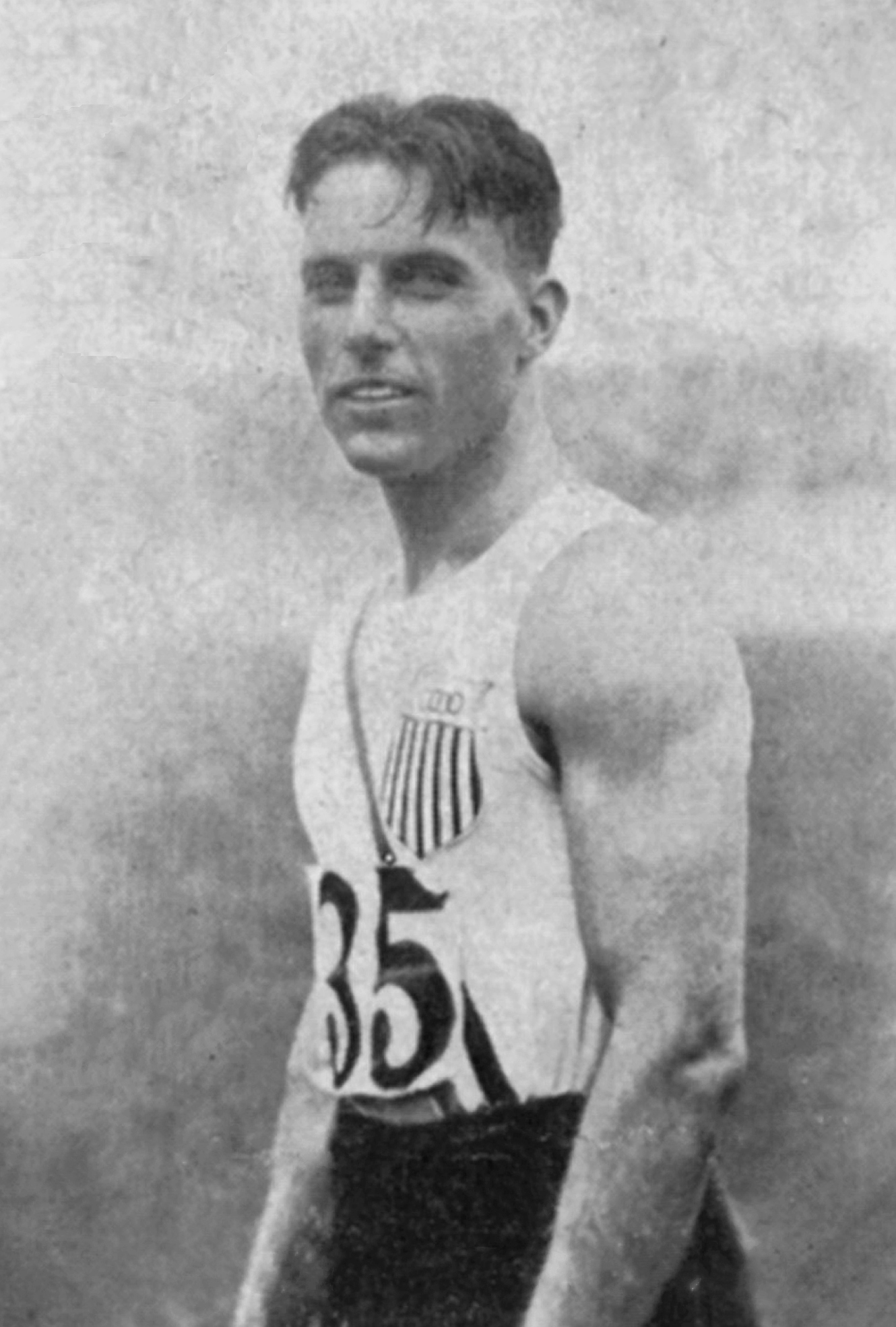

Personal information
- Full name: Lemuel Clarence Houser
- Born: September 25, 1901 Winigan, Missouri, U.S.
- Died: October 1, 1994 (aged 93) Gardena, California, U.S.
- Height: 6 ft 0.5 in (184 cm)
- Weight: 187 lb (85 kg)

Sport
- Sport: Athletics
- Events: Shot put, discus throw
- Club: LAAC, Los Angeles

Achievements and titles
- Personal bests: SP – 15.42 m (1926); DT – 48.20 m (1926)
Medal record
Representing the United States
Olympic Games
Gold medal – first place	1924 Paris	Shot put
Gold medal – first place	1924 Paris	Discus throw
Gold medal – first place	1928 Amsterdam	Discus throw

Lemuel Clarence "Bud" Houser (September 25, 1901 – October 1, 1994) was an American field athlete. He won Olympic gold medals in the discus throw in 1924 and 1928 and in the shot put in 1924.

== Biography ==
Houser was born in Winigan, Missouri, but later moved to Oxnard, California to escape the drought after both his parents died in 1911. He was raised by his sister Martha and her husband Walter Conklin. He gained his strength working in the fields; during summers he would load hay bales in 110-degree heat in Corcoran, California.

As a student at Oxnard High School, Houser participated in the California State Track Meets between 1920–22. His six wins in shot put and discus, each time breaking a state record, made him the most successful meet participant ever. He was named "Athlete of the Meet" three years in a row. During this time he developed a discus-throwing style of doing one and a half rapid turns in the circle before release that has been copied by many later athletes. He then enrolled at the University of Southern California in Los Angeles, California to study dentistry.

At the 1924 Summer Olympics in Paris, Houser won the gold medal in the shot put, ahead of fellow Americans Glenn Hartranft and Ralph Hills and in the discus, ahead of the Finn Vilho Niittymaa and the American Thomas Lieb. This was the last time a male athlete has won both the shot put and discus in the Olympics.

He won national championships in the discus in 1925, 1926, and 1928, and in the shot put in 1921 (while still in high school) and 1925. On April 3, 1926 in Palo Alto, in a USC dual meet with Stanford, he set a world record with a discus throw of 48.20 m.

At the 1928 Summer Olympics in Amsterdam he was the flag bearer for the United States team. There he retained his title in the discus throw, again leading a Finn, Antero Kivi, and an American James Corson.

Houser became a dentist to many movie stars with a practice in Hollywood, California before moving to Palm Desert, California. The stadium at Oxnard High School (the original location and now the new location) is named in his honor, the announcement a surprise at his graduation. He is a member of the National Track and Field Hall of Fame and an inaugural member of the Ventura County Athletic Hall of Fame.

Olympic Games
Preceded by Godfrey Dewey	Flagbearer for United States; Amsterdam 1928	Succeeded by Billy Fiske
Records
Preceded by (United States) Glenn Hartranft	Men's Discus World Record Holder; April 2, 1926 – March 9, 1929	Succeeded by (United States) Eric Krenz
