= Athletics at the 1924 Summer Olympics – Men's shot put =

Men's shot put at the Games of the VIII Olympiad
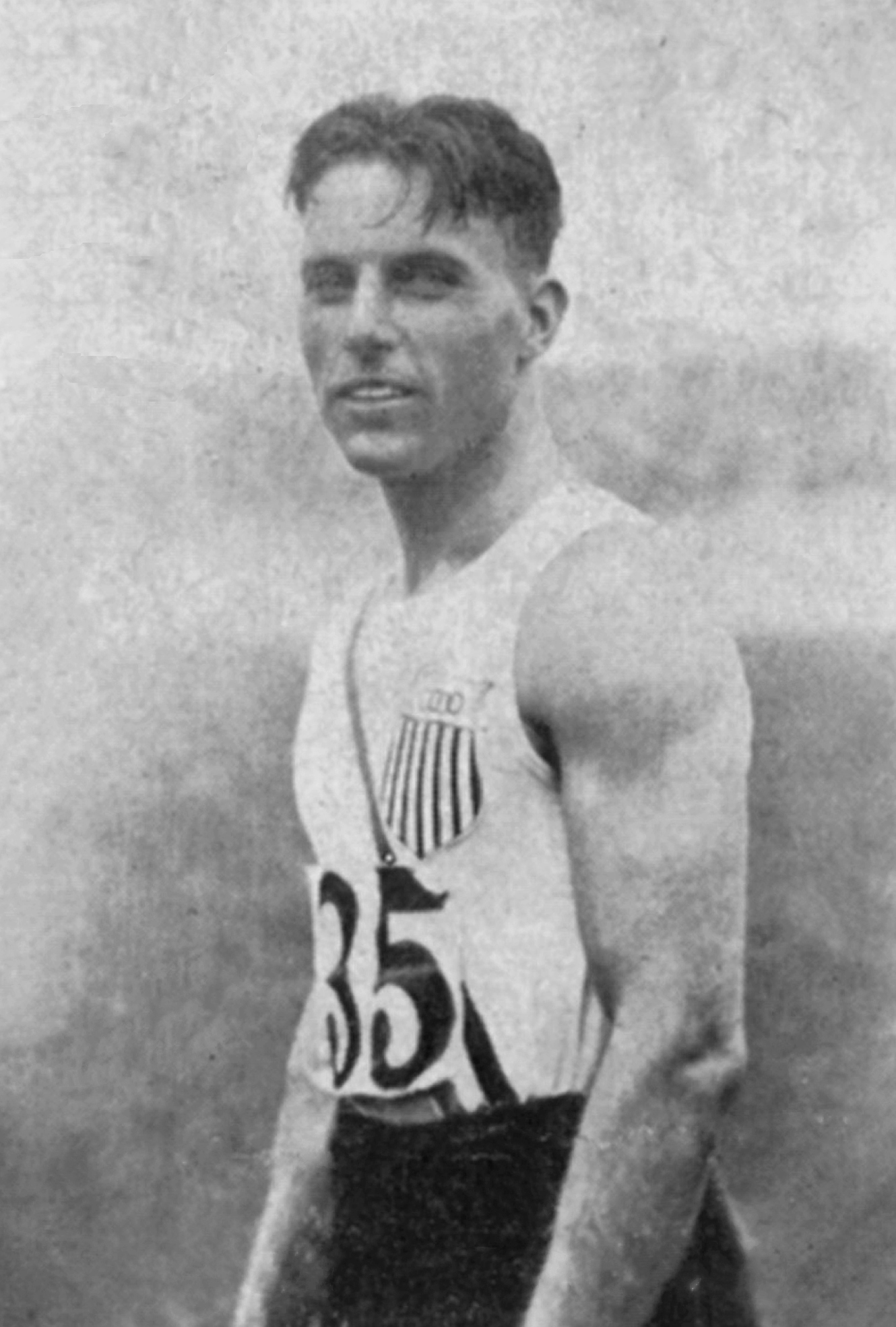
- Bud Houser
- Venue: Stade Olympique Yves-du-Manoir
- Date: July 8, 1924
- Competitors: 28 from 15 nations

Medalists
1st place, gold medalist(s)		Bud Houser; United States
2nd place, silver medalist(s)		Glenn Hartranft; United States
3rd place, bronze medalist(s)		Ralph Hills; United States

The men's shot put event was part of the track and field athletics programme at the 1924 Summer Olympics. The competition was held on Tuesday, July 8, 1924. 28 shot putters from 15 nations competed. The maximum number of athletes per nation was 4. The event was won by Bud Houser of the United States, the nation's sixth victory in the men's shot put (having won every Games except 1920). Glenn Hartranft took silver and Ralph Hills took bronze to complete the Americans' fourth medal sweep in the event.

== Background ==
This was the seventh appearance of the event, which is one of 12 athletics events to have been held at every Summer Olympics. Returning finalists from the 1920 Games were gold medalist Ville Pörhölä and silver medalist Elmer Niklander of Finland and sixth-place finisher Harald Tammer of Estonia. Glenn Hartranft of the United States was the favorite. 1924 Olympic discus champion Bud Houser had beaten Hartranft in the shot put at the 1924 AAU championships, however, and was a serious contender.

Brazil, Ireland, Latvia, Mexico, and Yugoslavia made their debut in the men's shot put. The United States appeared for the seventh time, the only nation to have competed in all Olympic shot put competitions to date.

== Competition format ==
The competition continued to use the two-round format used in 1900 and since 1908, with results carrying over between rounds. Each athlete received three throws in the qualifying round. The top six men advanced to the final, where they received an additional three throws. The best result, qualifying or final, counted.

== Records ==
These were the standing world and Olympic records (in metres) prior to the 1924 Summer Olympics.

World record	Ralph Rose (USA)	15.54	San Francisco, United States	21 August 1909
Olympic record	Pat McDonald (USA)	15.34	Stockholm, Sweden	10 July 1912

No new world or Olympic records were set during the competition.

== Schedule ==
Date	Time	Round
Tuesday, 8 July 1924	15:00	Qualifying; Final

== Results ==
The best six shot putters, all three groups counted together, qualified for the final. The throwing order and the throwing series are not available.

The final was held on the same day. Only two competitors were able to improve their qualification width. Glenn Hartranft jumped from a fourth rank to the silver medal.

Rank	Athlete	Nation	Qualifying	Final	Distance
1st place, gold medalist(s)	Bud Houser	United States	14.995	Unknown	14.995
2nd place, silver medalist(s)	Glenn Hartranft	United States	14.405	14.895	14.895
3rd place, bronze medalist(s)	Ralph Hills	United States	14.505	14.640	14.640
4	Hannes Torpo	Finland	14.450	Unknown	14.450
5	Norman Anderson	United States	14.290	Unknown	14.290
6	Elmer Niklander	Finland	14.265	Unknown	14.265
7	Ville Pörhölä	Finland	14.100	Did not advance	14.100
8	Bertil Jansson	Sweden	13.760	Did not advance	13.760
9	Raoul Paoli	France	13.535	Did not advance	13.535
10	Sixten Sundström	Sweden	13.530	Did not advance	13.530
11	Akseli Takala	Finland	13.315	Did not advance	13.315
12	Harald Tammer	Estonia	13.280	Did not advance	13.280
13	Veljko Narančić	Yugoslavia	13.215	Did not advance	13.215
14	Christos Vrettos	Greece	13.125	Did not advance	13.125
15	Ketil Askildt	Norway	13.090	Did not advance	13.090
16	Daniel Pierre	France	13.070	Did not advance	13.070
17	John O'Grady	Ireland	12.750	Did not advance	12.750
18	Pál Bedő	Hungary	12.660	Did not advance	12.660
19	Arvīds Ķibilds	Latvia	12.530	Did not advance	12.530
20	Charles Beckwith	Great Britain	12.480	Did not advance	12.480
21	Werner Nüesch	Switzerland	12.450	Did not advance	12.450
22	Maxime Bousselaire	France	12.265	Did not advance	12.265
23	Otto Garnus	Switzerland	12.120	Did not advance	12.120
24	Rex Woods	Great Britain	11.770	Did not advance	11.770
25	José Galimberti	Brazil	11.300	Did not advance	11.300
26	Dimitrios Karabatis	Greece	10.955	Did not advance	10.955
27	Jesús Aguirre	Mexico	9.470	Did not advance	9.470
28	Octávio Zani	Brazil	X	Did not advance	X

== Sources ==
- Official Report
- Wudarski, Pawel (1999). "Wyniki Igrzysk Olimpijskich" (in Polish).
