= Bierwirth =

Bierwirth is a German surname. Notable people with the surname include:

- John Bierwirth (c. 1924–2013), American lawyer and businessman
- Karl Bierwirth (1907–1955), German weightlifter
- Petra Bierwirth (born 1960), German politician
- Rudolph Bierwirth (1899–1993), Australian army officer
