= Josef Zeman =

Josef Zeman may refer to:

- Josef Zeman (footballer)
- Josef Zeman (wrestler)
- Josef Zeman (weightlifter)

== See also ==
- Josef Zemann (1923–2022), Austrian mineralogist and geologist
