= Juaneda =

Juaneda is a surname. Notable people with the surname include:

- David Muntaner Juaneda (born 1983), Spanish track cyclist
- Julio Juaneda (1912–?), Argentine weightlifter
