= Skobla =

Skobla (feminine: Skoblová) is a Czech surname. Notable people with the surname include:

- Jaroslav Skobla (1899–1959), Czech weightlifter
- Jiří Skobla (1930–1978), Czech athlete
