= Josef Tomáš =

Josef Tomáš can refer to:

- Josef Tomáš (runner) (born 1934), Czech long-distance runner
- Josef Tomáš (weightlifter) (born 1898), Czech weightlifter
