= Heikki Malmivirta =

Finnish discus thrower

Heikki Vilho Esaias Malmivirta (6 July 1898 – 18 January 1956), aka Malmström, was a Finnish track and field athlete who competed in the 1924 Summer Olympics. He was born and died in Piikkiö. In 1924 he was eliminated in the qualification of the discus throw competition and finished eighth overall.
