= El-Sayed Nosseir =

Egyptian weightlifter (1905–1974)

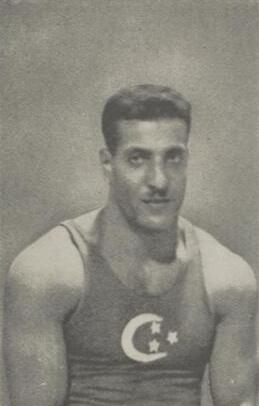
- El-Sayed Nosseir in 1928

Personal information
- Born: 31 August 1905 Tanta, Egypt
- Died: 28 November 1974 (aged 69) Cairo, Egypt

Sport
- Sport: Weightlifter
Medal record
Men's weightlifting
Representing Egypt
Olympic Games
Gold medal – first place	1928 Amsterdam	-82.5 kg

El-Sayed Mohammed Nosseir (Egyptian Arabic: السيد محمد نصير, August 31, 1905 – November 28, 1974) was an Egyptian weightlifter. Nosseir won the gold medal in the light heavyweight class at the 1928 Summer Olympics in Amsterdam. He set a new world record in both snatch with 112.5 kilograms and in the total of the three lifts with 355 kilograms, winning Egypt's first Olympic gold medal. Nosseir is considered a historic figure in sports, famously becoming the first Egyptian, and African to win a gold medal at the Olympic Games.

== Early life ==
Sayed Nosseir was born on August 31, 1905, in the village of Shubra, near Tanta. He attended the Tanta School and then Tanta Secondary School, where he began practicing weightlifting. At the Mawlid (festival) of Sayyid al-Badawi, Nosseir witnessed the performances of the renowned Egyptian weightlifting champion, Abdel Halim al-Masri, who is credited with popularizing weightlifting in Egypt. This sparked Nosseir's passion for the sport, and he returned to his school to form a weightlifting team.

== Career ==
In 1925, Nosseir participated in the Egyptian National Championship and won, holding the title until 1928. After winning the 1928 Egyptian National Championship in both the light heavyweight and heavyweight categories, Nosseir began preparing for the 1928 Summer Olympics in Amsterdam. He was coached by the Mohamed Bassiouni.

Nosseir won the gold medal in the light heavyweight category with a total of 355.5 kg (press 100 kg, snatch 110 kg, clean and jerk 147.5 kg), becoming the first Egyptian and African to win an Olympic gold medal.

Nosseir's fame spread throughout Egypt and the world after his return from Amsterdam. In Egypt, his achievement prompted the government to encourage the sport and establish clubs for weightlifting. His accomplishments also contributed to the popularity of weightlifting in Egypt. In 1930, Nosseir won the World Weightlifting Championships in the heavyweight category in Munich, and again in 1931 in Luxembourg.

His clean and jerk record remained unbroken for 15 years at 167 kg, until it was surpassed by his relative, the Egyptian champion Mohamed Geissa, who achieved 170.5 kg in 1945.

Nosseir received the Order of the Nile in the 1940s and the Order of Sports from President Gamal Abdel Nasser in October 1965. He was appointed Undersecretary of the Ministry of Youth and was responsible for the Scout and Guide groups during the clearing of Port Said in the 1956 war.

== Personal life and death ==
He had a son, Hassan, and two daughters, Fadia and Nadia. Sayed Nosseir died in 1974 at the age of 69. He was married and had three children. An international championship held in Alexandria was named after him and began in 1977.

== See also ==
- Egypt at the Olympics
