= Gabino Lizarza =

Spanish discus thrower (1888–1938)

Personal information
- Nationality: Spanish
- Born: 25 October 1888
- Died: 5 July 1938 (aged 49)

Sport
- Sport: Athletics
- Event: Discus throw

Gabino Lizarza (25 October 1888 – 5 July 1938) was a Spanish athlete. He competed in the men's discus throw at the 1924 Summer Olympics.
