= Hermann Eichholzer =

Swiss weightlifter

Personal information
- Nationality: Swiss
- Born: 15 June 1903

Sport
- Sport: Weightlifting

Hermann Eichholzer (born June 15, 1903) was a Swiss weightlifter. He competed in the men's middleweight event at the 1928 Summer Olympics. Eichholzer is deceased.
