= Sixten Sundström =

Swedish shot putter (1897–1960)

Personal information
- Nationality: Swedish
- Born: 24 October 1897 Ledberg, Sweden
- Died: 23 May 1960 (aged 62) Varbro, Sweden

Sport
- Sport: Athletics
- Event: Shot put

Sixten Sundström (24 October 1897 – 23 May 1960) was a Swedish athlete. He competed in the men's shot put at the 1924 Summer Olympics.
