= François Bremer =

Luxembourgish weightlifter

Personal information
- Nationality: Luxembourgish
- Born: 20 January 1900
- Died: 1960 (aged 59–60)

Sport
- Sport: Weightlifting

François Bremer (20 January 1900 – 1960) was a Luxembourgish weightlifter. He competed in the men's middleweight event at the 1928 Summer Olympics.
