= Bohumil Sýkora =

Czech weightlifter

Personal information
- Nationality: Czech
- Born: 1902

Sport
- Sport: Weightlifting

Bohumil Sýkora (born 1902, date of death unknown) was a Czech weightlifter. He competed in the men's middleweight event at the 1928 Summer Olympics.
