= Albert Aeschmann =

Swiss weightlifter

Albert Aeschmann (born 20 August 1900; date of death unknown) was a Swiss weightlifter who competed in the 1924 Summer Olympics, in the 1928 Summer Olympics, and in the 1936 Summer Olympics. In 1924 he finished fifth in the middleweight class. Four years later he finished fourth in the lightweight class at the 1928 Games. At the 1936 Olympics he finished 13th in the middleweight class. Having been the Swiss champion 18 times throughout his career, winning 14 of them consecutively, he was described by the Journal de Genève as having been "incontestably" the best weightlifter.
