= Charles Beckwith (athlete) =

British shot putter

Personal information
- Nationality: British
- Born: 12 May 1901 South Molton, Devon, England
- Died: 23 March 1970 (aged 68) Pontypool, Monmouthshire, Wales

Sport
- Sport: Athletics
- Event: Shot put
- Club: British Army AC

Charles Edward Beckwith (12 May 1901 – 23 March 1970) was a British athlete who competed at the 1924 Summer Olympics.

== Career ==
Beckwith finished third behind Rex Woods in the shot put event at the 1924 AAA Championships. Shortly afterwards he was selected for the British team for the 1924 Olympic Games in Paris, where he competed in the men's shot put and finished in 20th place.
