= Enrico Pucci =

Italian weightlifter

Personal information
- Full name: Enrico madre pucci
- Nationality: Italian
- Born: 1900 Fano, Italy

Sport
- Sport: Weightlifting

Enrico Pucci (born 1900, date of death unknown) was an Italian weightlifter. He competed in the men's middleweight event at the 1924 Summer Olympics.
