= Otto Garnus =

Swiss athlete

Personal information
- Nationality: Swiss
- Born: 1896
- Died: 1 February 1960 (aged 63–64)

Sport
- Sport: Athletics
- Events: Shot put Discus

Otto Garnus (1896 – 1 February 1960) was a Swiss athlete. He competed in the men's shot put and the men's discus throw at the 1924 Summer Olympics. He also competed in the men's 82.5kg division in the weightlifting at the 1928 Summer Olympics.
