= Pál Bedő =

Hungarian shot putter

Personal information
- Nationality: Hungarian
- Born: 23 June 1896
- Died: 22 April 1965 (aged 69)

Sport
- Sport: Athletics
- Event: Shot put

Pál Bedő (23 June 1896 – 22 April 1965) was a Hungarian athlete. He competed in the men's shot put at the 1924 Summer Olympics.
