= Olaf Luiga =

Estonian weightlifter

Personal information
- Nationality: Estonian
- Born: 23 August 1908; Omsk, Russia
- Died: 5 July 1939 (aged 30); Tartu, Estonia

Sport
- Sport: Weightlifting

Olaf Luiga (23 August 1908 – 5 July 1939) was an Estonian weightlifter. He competed in the men's light heavyweight event at the 1928 Summer Olympics.

Luiga began training as a boxer at the Kalev Tallinn multi-sport club in 1924 with Valter Palm. From 1933 to 1939 he was a member of the board of the Kalev Weightlifting Department. He was a member of both the Estonian national weightlifting and wrestling teams. He died of cancer, aged 30, and was buried in Tallinn's Rahumäe cemetery.
