= Franz Nitterl =

Austrian weightlifter

Personal information
- Nationality: Austrian

Sport
- Sport: Weightlifting

Franz Nitterl was an Austrian weightlifter. He competed in the men's middleweight event at the 1928 Summer Olympics. Nitterl is deceased.
