= Nils Lidman =

Swedish weightlifter

Personal information
- Nationality: Swedish
- Born: 15 February 1900; Borås, Sweden
- Died: 26 July 1976 (aged 76); Gothenburg, Sweden

Sport
- Sport: Weightlifting

Nils Lidman (15 February 1900 – 26 July 1976) was a Swedish weightlifter. He competed in the men's middleweight event at the 1924 Summer Olympics.
