= Ángel Rovere =

Argentine weightlifter

Personal information
- Nationality: Argentine
- Born: 1897

Sport
- Sport: Weightlifting

Ángel Rovere (born 1897, date of death unknown) was an Argentine weightlifter. He competed in the men's middleweight event at the 1924 Summer Olympics.
