= Edmond Donzé =

Swiss weightlifter

Personal information
- Nationality: Swiss
- Born: 15 March 1899
- Died: 13 December 1966 (aged 67)

Sport
- Sport: Weightlifting

Edmond Donzé (15 March 1899 – 13 December 1966) was a Swiss weightlifter. He competed in the men's light heavyweight event at the 1928 Summer Olympics.
