= Karl Hipfinger =

Austrian weightlifter (1905–1984)

Olympic medal record

Men's Weightlifting
Bronze medal – third place	1932 Los Angeles	– 75 kg

Karl Hipfinger (October 28, 1905 – April 20, 1984) was an Austrian weightlifter who competed in the 1928 and 1932 Summer Olympics.

He was born in Vienna.

In 1928 he failed to set a mark in the clean and jerk competition of the middleweight class.

Four years later, at the 1932 games, he won a bronze medal in the middleweight class.
