= Willi Hoffmann (weightlifter) =

German weightlifter

Personal information
- Nationality: German

Sport
- Sport: Weightlifting

Willi Hoffmann was a German weightlifter. He competed in the men's middleweight event at the 1928 Summer Olympics.
