= Sam Termine =

American weightlifter (1909–1978)

Samuel Termine (September 1, 1909 – May 1978) was an American weightlifter who competed in the 1932 Summer Olympics.

He was born in Mayfield, Pennsylvania and died in Las Vegas, Nevada.

In 1932 he finished seventh in the middleweight class.
