= Jules Van Der Goten =

Belgian weightlifter

Jules Jean Vandergoten
Personal information
- Nationality: Belgian
- Born: 23 July 1901; Brussels, Belgium

Sport
- Sport: Weightlifting

Jules Vandergoten (born 23 July 1901) was a Belgian weightlifter. He competed in the men's light heavyweight event at the 1928 Summer Olympics.

Vandergoten was the brother of fellow Belgian weightlifter Maurice Vandergoten.
