= Alfred Neuland =

Estonian weightlifter (1895–1966)

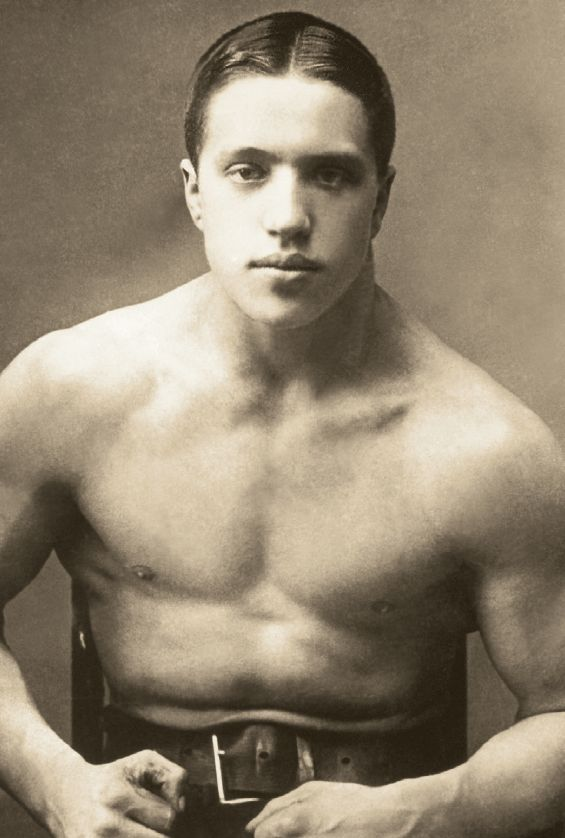
- Neuland in 1920

Personal information
- Born: 10 October 1895 Walk, Governorate of Livonia, Russian Empire
- Died: 16 November 1966 (aged 71) Tallinn, then part of Estonian SSR, Soviet Union
- Height: 166 cm (5 ft 5 in)
- Weight: 74 kg (163 lb)

Sport
- Sport: Weightlifting
- Club: Kalev Tallinn
Medal record
Representing Estonia
Olympic Games
| Gold medal – first place | 1920 Antwerp | -67.5 kg |
| Silver medal – second place | 1924 Paris | -75 kg |
World Championships
| Gold medal – first place | 1922 Tallinn | -75 kg |

Alfred Karl Neuland (10 October 1895 – 16 November 1966) was an Estonian weightlifter. He competed in the 1920 and 1924 Olympics and won a gold and a silver medal, respectively, becoming the first Olympic gold medalist from Estonia. He won a world title in 1922, and set three ratified world records in 1920–23: one in the snatch and two in the clean and jerk.

Born in Walk (Valga), Governorate of Livonia Neuland studied in Riga, Latvia, and Saint Petersburg, Russia. He took up weightlifting relatively early, and placed second at the Russian championships in 1913 and 1914; he won the Russian lightweight title in 1915 and middleweight title in 1916. Neuland then fought in World War I and in the Estonian War of Independence, and after demobilization he won Estonian weightlifting titles in 1921, 1923 and 1924. After that he retired from competitions and worked as a businessman, weightlifting coach and referee in his hometown of Valga from 1921 to 1940. From 1950 to 1955, Neuland headed the Estonian Experimental Soft Drinks Factory in Tallinn. In 1995 a monument in his honor was installed in Valga, and since 2000 an annual memorial weightlifting tournament has been held there.
