= Léon Vandeputte =

French weightlifter

Personal information
- Nationality: French
- Born: 20 August 1901; Roubaix, France
- Died: 7 April 1981 (aged 79)

Sport
- Sport: Weightlifting

Léon Vandeputte (20 August 1901 – 7 April 1981) was a French weightlifter. He competed in the men's middleweight event at the 1924 Summer Olympics.
