= Povilas Vitonis =

Lithuanian weightlifter

Personal information
- Nationality: Lithuanian

Sport
- Sport: Weightlifter

Povilas Vitonis was a Lithuanian weightlifter.

Vitonis competed at the 1928 Summer Olympics in Amsterdam, Netherlands, he entered the men's middleweight contest, and successfully lifted 85kg in the Press, another 85kg in the snatch and 105kg in the clean & jerk, giving him a total of 275kg and finished in 15th place.
