= Jack Austin (weightlifter) =

British weightlifter

Personal information
- Nationality: British
- Born: 3 February 1900
- Died: 23 March 1988 (aged 88)

Sport
- Sport: Weightlifting

Jack Austin (3 February 1900 – 23 March 1988) was a British weightlifter. He competed in the men's middleweight event at the 1924 Summer Olympics.
