= Teodors Sukatnieks =

Latvian athlete

Personal information
- Nationality: Latvian
- Born: 19 May 1894 Ventspils, Russian Empire
- Died: between 1941 and 1944 Sverdlovsk, Soviet Union

Sport
- Sport: Athletics
- Event: Discus throw

Teodors Sukatnieks (born 19 May 1894, died between 1941 and 1944) was a Latvian athlete. He competed in the men's discus throw at the 1924 Summer Olympics. He died during World War II in a Soviet prison camp.
