= 1923 World Weightlifting Championships =

International weightlifting competition

1923 Men's World Championships
- Host city: Vienna, Austria
- Dates: September 8–9, 1923

The 1923 Men's World Weightlifting Championships were held in Vienna, Austria from September 8 to September 9, 1923. There were 76 men in action from 7 nations.

== Medal summary ==
Event	Gold		Silver		Bronze	
Featherweight; 60 kg	Andreas Stadler; Austria	330.0 kg	Wilhelm Rosinek; Austria	315.0 kg	Emil Kliment; Austria	307.5 kg
Lightweight; 67.5 kg	Rudolf Edinger; Austria	360.0 kg	Heinrich Baumann; Germany	350.0 kg	Bohumil Durdis; Czechoslovakia	347.5 kg
Middleweight; 75 kg	Karl Freiberger; Austria	387.5 kg	Leopold Friedrich; Austria	375.0 kg	Alberts Ozoliņš; Latvia	355.0 kg
Light heavyweight 82.5 kg	Jaroslav Skobla; Czechoslovakia	387.5 kg	Sebastian Haberl; Austria	370.0 kg	August Böhnel; Austria	370.0 kg
Heavyweight +82.5 kg	Franz Aigner; Austria	420.0 kg	Josef Leppelt; Austria	400.0 kg	Georg Schrammel; Austria	397.5 kg

== Medal table ==
Rank	Nation	Gold	Silver	Bronze	Total
1	Austria	4	4	3	11
2	Czechoslovakia	1	0	1	2
3	Germany	0	1	0	1
4	Latvia	0	0	1	1
Totals (4 entries)		5	5	5	15
