= Johann Gill =

Austrian weightlifter

Personal information
- Nationality: Austrian
- Born: 1904
- Died: September 1937 (aged 32–33)

Sport
- Sport: Weightlifting

Johann Gill (1904 – September 1937) was an Austrian weightlifter. He competed in the men's middleweight event at the 1924 Summer Olympics.
