= Akseli Takala =

Finnish shot putter

Personal information
- Nationality: Finnish
- Born: 23 May 1897 Kuortane, Finland
- Died: 18 March 1951 (aged 53) Koria, Finland

Sport
- Sport: Athletics
- Event: Shot put

Akseli Takala (23 May 1897 – 18 March 1951) was a Finnish athlete. He competed in the men's shot put at the 1924 Summer Olympics.
