= Alberts Ozoliņš =

Latvian weightlifter (1896–1985)

Alberts Ozoliņš (10 May 1896 – 28 February 1985) was a Latvian weightlifter who competed for Latvia at the 1924 Summer Olympics in Paris at age 27.

Born in Kūkas Parish, Ozoliņš was a silver medalist in the men's middleweight division at the 1922 World Weightlifting Championships in Tallinn, Estonia and a bronze medalist at the 1923 World Weightlifting Championships in Vienna, Austria. Ozoliņš was a men's middleweight class wrestler and placed at number 25 at the 1924 Summer Olympics. He died in Jūrmala in 1985.
