= Norman Anderson (athlete) =

American shot putter (1902–1978)

Personal information
- Born: March 17, 1902 Barre, Vermont, U.S.
- Died: March 7, 1978 (aged 75) Los Angeles, California, U.S.
- Education: USC

Sport
- Sport: Athletics

Norman Frotjof Anderson (March 17, 1902 – March 7, 1978) was an American track and field athlete who competed in the 1924 Summer Olympics.

== Biography ==
Norman F. Anderson was born in Barre, Vermont on March 17, 1902. His family later relocated to Oklahoma, and then to California.

He attended the University of Southern California, where he played football and was a member of the track and field team. He participated in USC's first Rose Bowl Game in 1923.

In 1924, he was a member of the U.S. Olympic Team, and finished fifth in the shot put competition.

Anderson graduated from USC in 1925 with a degree in Commerce. He was employed by Richfield Oil Corporation, and became manager of the company's southern California pipelines.

Anderson died in Hermosa Beach, California on March 7, 1978.
