= Nicolas Horsch =

Belgian weightlifter

Personal information
- Nationality: Belgian
- Born: 23 March 1889
- Died: 18 October 1940 (aged 51)

Sport
- Sport: Weightlifting

Nicolas Horsch (23 March 1889 – 18 October 1940) was a Belgian weightlifter. He competed in the men's middleweight event at the 1924 Summer Olympics.
