= Jan Kostrba =

Czech weightlifter

Personal information
- Nationality: Czech
- Born: 19 June 1901
- Died: 2 April 1969 (aged 67)

Sport
- Sport: Weightlifting

Jan Kostrba (19 June 1901 – 2 April 1969) was a Czech weightlifter. He competed in the men's middleweight event at the 1928 Summer Olympics.
