= Robert Lowes (weightlifter) =

British weightlifter

Personal information
- Nationality: British
- Born: 17 April 1904; Southwark, England
- Died: 1968 (aged 63–64); Enfield, England

Sport
- Sport: Weightlifting

Robert Lowes (17 April 1904 – 1968) was a British weightlifter. He competed in the men's middleweight event at the 1924 Summer Olympics.
