= Dante Figoli =

Italian weightlifter

Personal information
- Full name: Dante Maria Umberto Figoli
- Nationality: Italian
- Born: 17 July 1896; Genoa, Kingdom of Italy
- Died: 29 July 1975 (aged 79); Genoa, Italy

Sport
- Sport: Weightlifting

Dante Figoli (17 July 1896 – 29 July 1975) was an Italian weightlifter. He competed in the men's middleweight event at the 1924 Summer Olympics.
