= Maxime Bousselaire =

French shot putter

Personal information
- Nationality: French
- Born: 19 August 1901
- Died: 3 November 1997 (aged 96)

Sport
- Sport: Athletics
- Event: Shot put

Maxime Bousselaire (19 August 1901 – 3 November 1997) was a French athlete. He competed in the men's shot put at the 1924 Summer Olympics.
