= Hannes Torpo =

Finnish shot putter

Kaarlo Johannes ("Hannes") Torpo (21 January 1901 – 10 September 1980) was a Finnish track and field athlete who competed in the 1924 Summer Olympics. He was born in Keikyä, Pirkanmaa and died in Helsinki. In 1924, he finished fourth in the shot put competition.
