= Rupert Eidler =

Austrian weightlifter

Personal information
- Nationality: Austrian
- Born: 6 February 1898
- Died: 24 July 1965 (aged 67)

Sport
- Sport: Weightlifting

Rupert Eidler (6 February 1898 – 24 July 1965) was an Austrian weightlifter. He competed in the men's middleweight event at the 1924 Summer Olympics.
