= Jan Van Rompaey =

Belgian weightlifter

Personal information
- Nationality: Belgian

Sport
- Sport: Weightlifting

Jan Van Rompaey was a Belgian weightlifter. He competed in the men's middleweight event at the 1928 Summer Olympics.
