= Alfredo Gomes =

Brazilian long-distance runner

Personal information
- Born: 16 January 1899 São Paulo, Brazil
- Died: 17 March 1963 (aged 64)

Sport
- Sport: Long-distance running
- Event: 5000 metres

Alfredo Gomes (16 January 1899 – 17 March 1963) was a Brazilian long-distance runner. He competed in the men's 5000 metres at the 1924 Summer Olympics.
