= Jaroslav Skobla =

Czech weightlifter

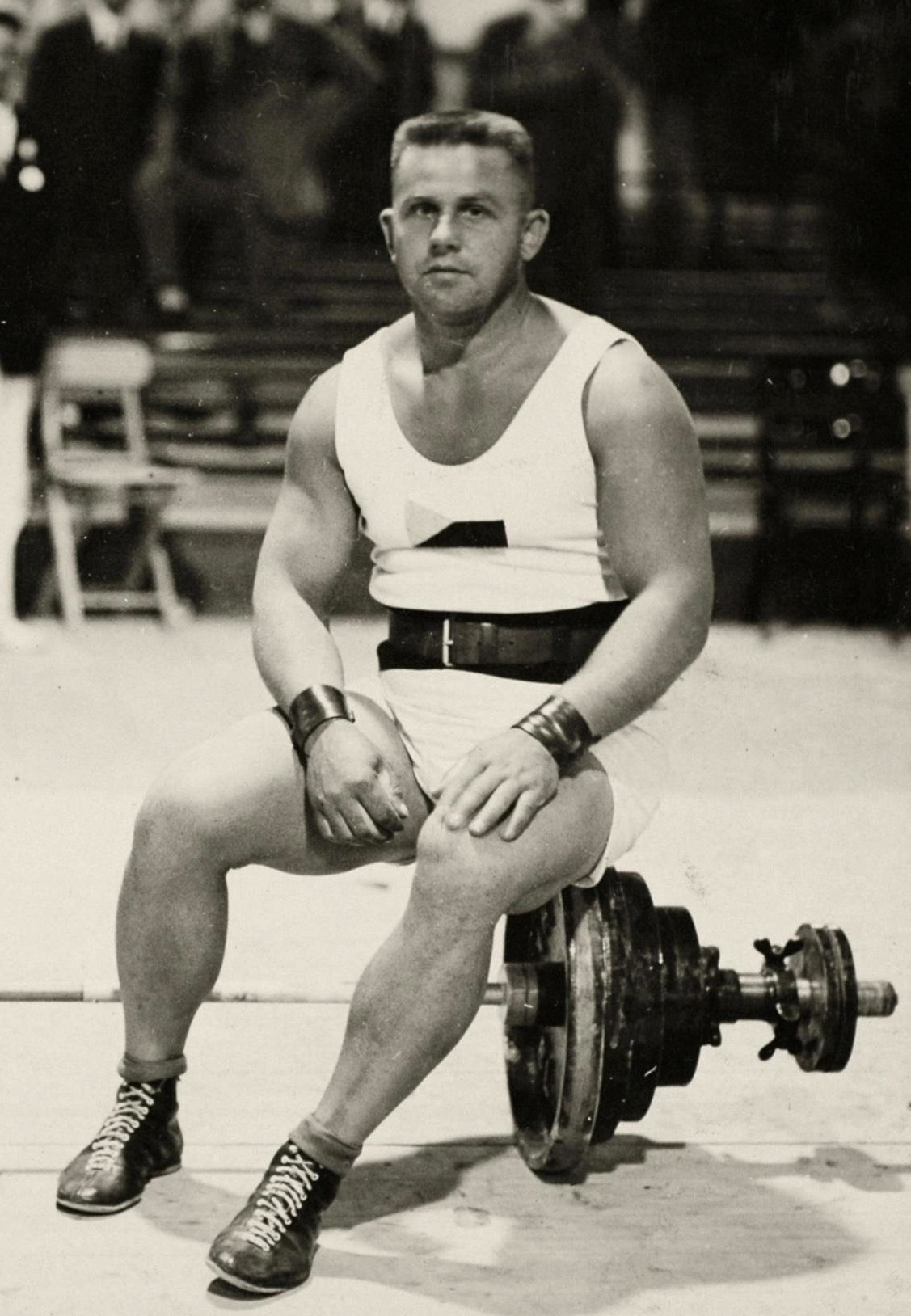
- Jaroslav Skobla at the 1928 Olympics

Personal information
- Born: 16 April 1899 Prague, Austria-Hungary
- Died: 22 November 1959 (aged 60) Teplice nad Bečvou, Czechoslovakia
- Height: 1.78 m (5 ft 10 in)
- Weight: 83 kg (183 lb)

Sport
- Sport: Weightlifting
Medal record
Representing Czechoslovakia
Olympic Games
| Bronze medal – third place | 1928 Amsterdam | Heavyweight; 100+107.5+150 kg |
| Gold medal – first place | 1932 Los Angeles | Heavyweight; 112.5+115+152.5 kg |
World Championships
| Gold medal – first place | 1923 Vienna | Light-heavyweight; 387.5 kg |

Jaroslav Skobla (16 April 1899 – 22 November 1959) was a Czech weightlifter, representing Czechoslovakia. After winning a world light-heavyweight title in 1923 he was a favorite at the 1924 Olympics, but finished in a mere eighth place. Skobla then moved to the heavyweight category and won a bronze and a gold medal at the 1928 and 1932 Games, respectively. He worked as an accountant, bouncer, and policeman. His friends collected money to send him to the Olympics.

His son Jiří was an Olympic shot put competitor.
