= Willy Seewald =

Brazilian javelin thrower

Personal information
- Nationality: Brazilian
- Born: 5 October 1900
- Died: 2 February 1929 (aged 28)

Sport
- Sport: Athletics
- Event: Javelin throw

Willy Seewald (5 October 1900 – 2 February 1929) was a Brazilian athlete. He competed in the men's javelin throw at the 1924 Summer Olympics.
