= Alberto Byington =

Brazilian hurdler

Personal information
- Full name: Alberto Jackson Byington Jr.
- Nationality: Brazilian
- Born: 18 May 1902
- Died: 17 December 1964 (aged 62)

Sport
- Sport: Track and field
- Event: 110 metres hurdles

Alberto Jackson Byington Jr. (18 May 1902 – 17 December 1964) was a Brazilian athlete, industrialist and filmmaker.

Born in São Paulo, he spent time in both the U.S. and Brazil and attended Harvard University for three years, graduating in 1924 with a degree in History and Iberian Literature. He played association football at Harvard and also was selected to represent Brazil at the 1924 Summer Olympics, competing in the men's 110 metres hurdles.

Byington became a noted innovator in Brazil, following in the footsteps of his father who invested in Brazil's first electrical grids. He was active in the radio broadcasting business and founded the first record, motion picture and air conditioning establishments in the country's history. In 1931, he produced Coisas Nossas, the first sound film in the country. He made over a dozen films between 1925 and 1944.

Byington was a described in an obituary as a "strong advocate of free enterprise and democracy". He attended the University of São Paulo in later years and received a degree in Legal and Social Sciences; he fought class action lawsuits in opposition to two Presidents of Brazil. He died on 17 December 1964.
