= Glenn Hartranft =

American shot putter and discus thrower

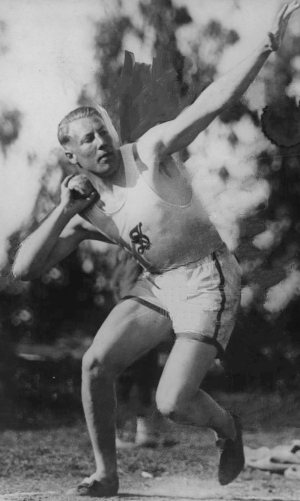
- Hartranft in 1924

Personal information
- Full name: Samuel Glenn Hartranft
- Born: December 3, 1901 Aberdeen, South Dakota, U.S.
- Died: August 12, 1970 (aged 68) San Diego, California, U.S.
- Education: Stanford University
- Height: 6 ft 3 in (1.90 m)
- Weight: 254 lb (115 kg)

Sport
- Country: United States
- Sport: Athletics
- Events: Discus throw, shot put
- Club: Stanford Cardinal

Achievements and titles
- Personal bests: DT – 48.18 m (1924); SP – 15.53 m (1924)
Medal record
Men's athletics
Representing the United States
Olympic Games
Silver medal – second place	1924 Paris	Shot put

Samuel Glenn "Tiny" Hartranft (December 3, 1901 – August 12, 1970) was an American athlete. He competed in the shot put and discus throw at the 1924 Summer Olympics and won a silver medal in the shot put, placing sixth in the discus. He won the IC4A championships in both events in 1922 and 1924. In 1924 he set a world record in the discus, which was not ratified because of high wind. He set an official world record next year at 47.89 m.

Hartranft was head football coach at San Jose State University in 1942 and the school's head baseball coach from 1944 to 1945.

== Head coaching record ==
=== Football ===
Year	Team	Overall	Conference	Standing	Bowl/playoffs
San Jose State Spartans (Independent) (1942)
1942	San Jose State	7–2			
San Jose State:		7–2			
Total:		7–2			

Records
Preceded by (United States) Thomas Lieb	Men's Discus World Record Holder; May 2, 1925 – April 2, 1926	Succeeded by (United States) Bud Houser
