= Victor Van Hamme =

Belgian weightlifter (1897–1971)

V. Van Hamme
Personal information
- Nationality: Belgian
- Born: 4 July 1897 Ghent
- Died: 14 December 1971 (aged 74) Ghent

Sport
- Sport: Weightlifting

Victor Van Hamme (4 July 1897 – 14 December 1971) was a Belgian weightlifter. He competed at the 1924 Summer Olympics and the 1928 Summer Olympics.
