= Paul Béranger =

French discus thrower

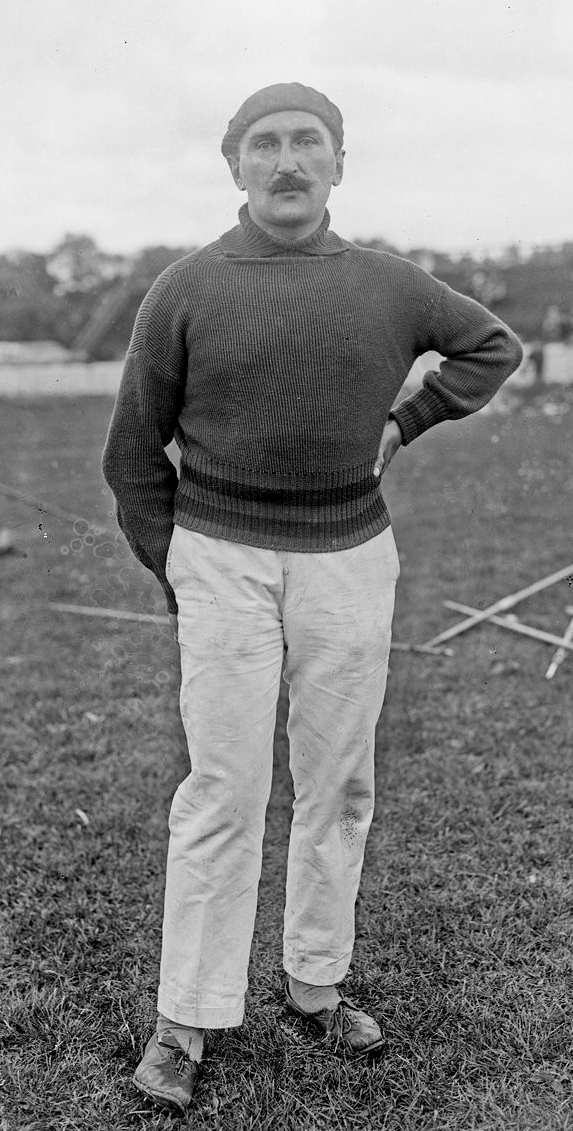
- Paul Béranger in 1922

Personal information
- Born: 11 April 1892
- Died: 27 December 1942 (aged 50)

Sport
- Sport: Athletics
- Event: discus throw
- Club: Stade français, Paris

Achievements and titles
- Personal best: DT – 41.61 m (1923)

Paul Béranger (11 April 1892 – 27 December 1942) was a French discus thrower. He competed at the 1924 Summer Olympics and finished in 14th place.
