= Vilho Niittymaa =

Finnish track and field athlete (1896–1979)

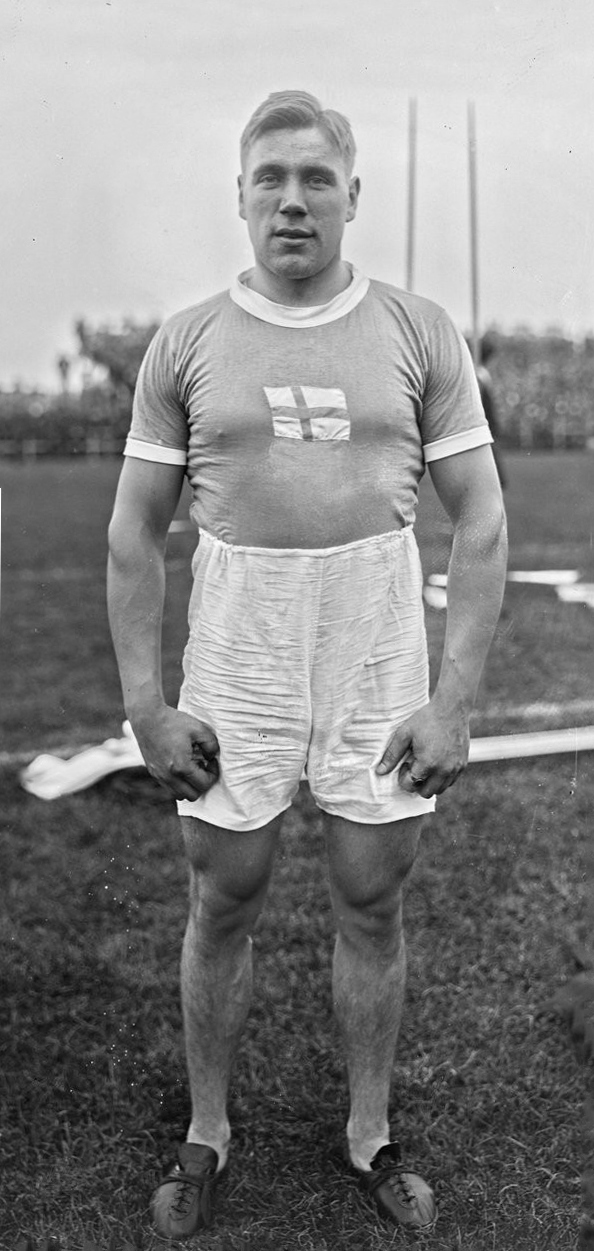
- Vilho Niittymaa in 1922

Personal information
- Born: 19 August 1896 Yläne, Finland
- Died: 29 June 1979 (aged 82) Helsinki, Finland
- Height: 1.79 m (5 ft 10 in)
- Weight: 80 kg (176 lb)

Sport
- Sport: Athletics
- Events: Discus throw, hammer throw, shot put
- Club: Rauman Urheilijat

Achievements and titles
- Personal bests: DT – 46.95 m (1923); HT – 37.13 m (1919); SP – 13.57 m (1922)
Medal record
Representing Finland
Olympic Games
Silver medal – second place	1924 Paris	Discus throw

Vilho Aleksander Niittymaa (19 August 1896 – 29 June 1979) was a Finnish athlete who competed in the discus throw, hammer throw and shot put.

== Career ==
Niittymaa won the British AAA Championships title in the discus event and finished third behind fellow Finn Ville Pörhölä in the shot put event at the 1922 AAA Championships.

Niittymaa won a silver medal in the discus at the 1924 Summer Olympics.
