= Jaan Kikkas =

Estonian weightlifter

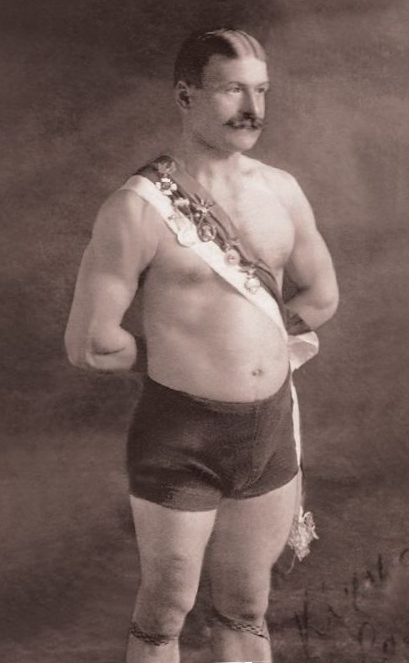

Personal information
- Born: 5 June 1892 Valga, Governorate of Livonia, Russian Empire
- Died: 9 March 1944 (aged 51) Tallinn, then part of Generalbezirk Estland, Reichskomissariat Ostland
- Weight: 75 kg (165 lb)

Sport
- Sport: Weightlifting
- Club: Kalev Tartu
Medal record
Representing Estonia
Olympic Games
Bronze medal – third place	1924 Paris	Middleweight

Juhan "Jaan" Kikkas (5 June 1892 – 9 March 1944) was an Estonian middleweight weightlifter. He won a bronze medal at the 1924 Summer Olympics, setting a world record in the snatch.

Kikkas first trained as a cyclist, and changed to weightlifting in 1921, aged 29. Next year, he placed fourth at the world championships. In 1925, he won his only national weightlifting title. After retiring from competitions, he ran his metal workshop in Tallinn. He died there in 1944 during a Soviet air raid.
