= Eurico de Freitas =

Brazilian pole vaulter

Personal information
- Nationality: Brazilian
- Born: 21 May 1902
- Died: 19 September 1991 (aged 89)

Sport
- Sport: Athletics
- Event: Pole vault

Eurico de Freitas (21 May 1902 – 19 September 1991) was a Brazilian athlete. He competed in the men's pole vault at the 1924 Summer Olympics.
