= Guus Scheffer =

Dutch weightlifter (1898–1952)

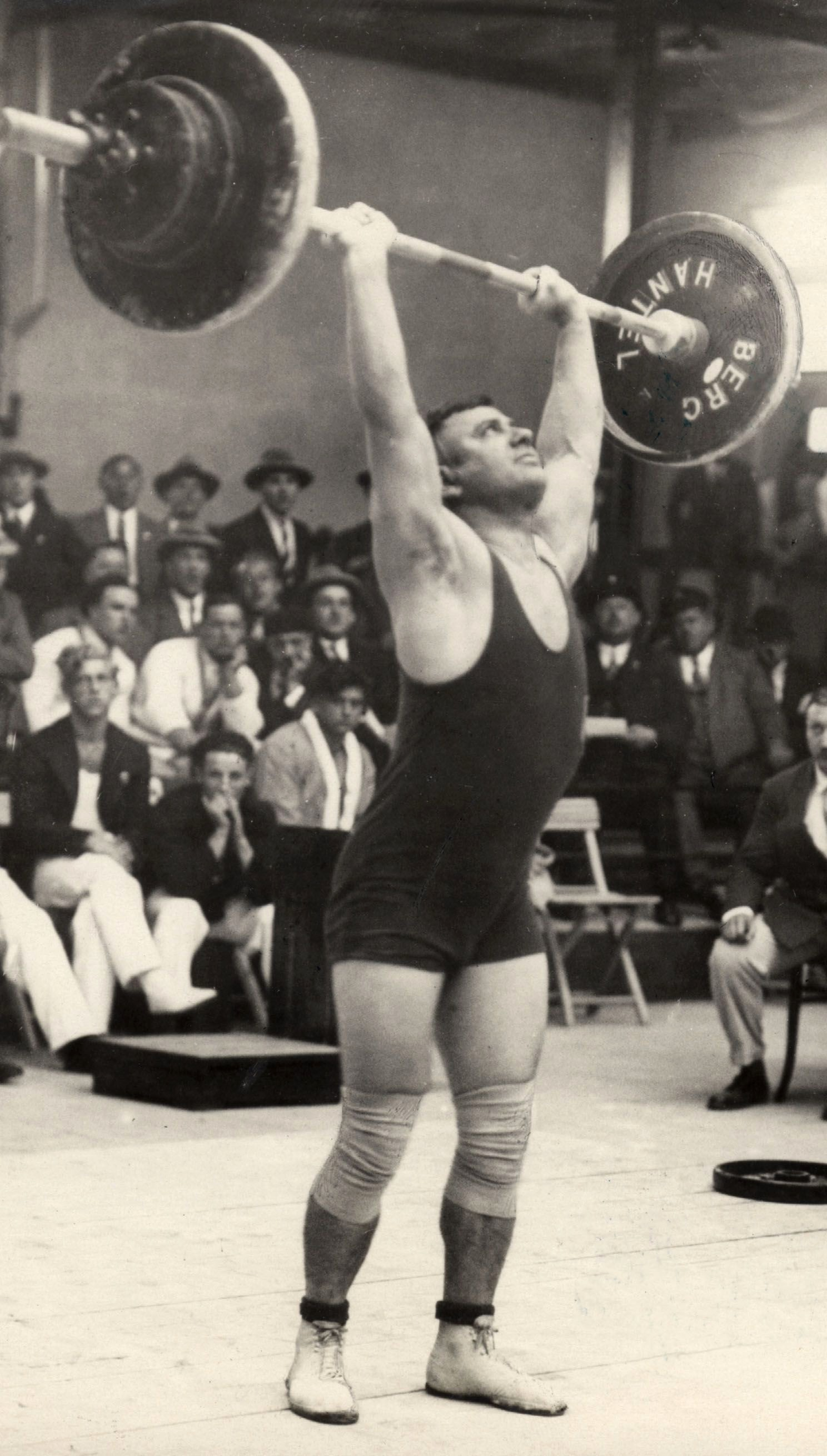
- Guus Scheffer at the 1928 Olympics

Personal information
- Born: 24 November 1898 Haarlem, the Netherlands
- Died: 1 November 1952 (aged 54) Haarlem, the Netherlands

Sport
- Sport: Weightlifting
- Club: Krachtsportvereniging Haarlem
Medal record
Representing the Netherlands
Olympic Games
Bronze medal – third place	1928 Amsterdam	Middleweight

August "Guus" Scheffer (24 November 1898 – 1 November 1952) was a Dutch weightlifter. He competed at the 1924 and 1928 Summer Olympics in the lightweight and middleweight categories and finished in seventh and third place, respectively.
