= Josef Tomáš (weightlifter) =

Czech weightlifter

Personal information
- Nationality: Czech
- Born: 1898

Sport
- Sport: Weightlifting

Josef Tomáš (born 1898, date of death unknown) was a Czech weightlifter. He competed in the men's middleweight event at the 1924 Summer Olympics.
