= Michel Mertens =

Luxembourgish weightlifter

Personal information
- Nationality: Luxembourgish
- Born: 30 January 1902 Tintange, Belgium
- Died: 23 December 1971 (aged 69) Luxembourg, Luxembourg

Sport
- Sport: Weightlifting

Michel Mertens (30 January 1902 – 23 December 1971) was a Luxembourgish weightlifter. He competed at the 1920 Summer Olympics and the 1924 Summer Olympics.
