= José Galimberti =

Brazilian athlete

Personal information
- Nationality: Brazilian
- Born: 15 January 1886
- Died: 12 January 1961 (aged 64)

Sport
- Sport: Athletics
- Events: Shot put Discus

José Galimberti (15 January 1896 – 12 January 1961) was a Brazilian athlete. He competed in the men's shot put and the men's discus throw at the 1924 Summer Olympics.
