= Ralph Hills =

American shot putter and physician

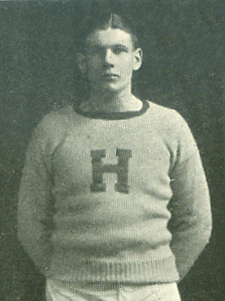
- Hills in 1921

Personal information
- Born: January 19, 1902 Washington, D.C., U.S.
- Died: September 20, 1977 (aged 75) Baltimore, Maryland, U.S.
- Height: 185 cm (6 ft 1 in)
- Weight: 95 kg (209 lb)

Sport
- Sport: Athletics
- Events: Shot put, hammer throw
- Club: Princeton Tigers

Achievements and titles
- Personal bests: SP – 15.26 m (1925); HT – 48.43 m (1924)
Medal record
Representing United States
Olympic Games
Bronze medal – third place	1924 Paris	Shot put

Ralph Gorman Hills (January 19, 1902 – September 20, 1977) was an American shot putter. After winning a bronze medal at the 1924 Summer Olympics, he married a state governor's daughter, graduated from Princeton and Johns Hopkins Universities, and became a physician. Hills lived near Baltimore, Maryland, and served in the United States Army during World War II.

== Early life, education, and career ==
Hills, a grandson of U.S. Senator Arthur Pue Gorman, was born to Ralph Warren Hills (1875–1940), a lawyer and diplomat, and Mary Edna Gorman Hills (1876–1944) on January 19, 1902. He attended The Hill School in Pottstown, Pennsylvania, from 1916 through graduation in 1921, where he was on the football team, served as class president, and developed his track athletics skills. Continuing his education at Princeton University, from which he graduated in 1925, Hills was captain of the track team. He pursued his M.D. degree at Johns Hopkins University, married Mary Joe Dixon (daughter of Montana governor Joseph M. Dixon) in 1928, and graduated in 1929. After an internship year at Union Memorial Hospital, and residencies at the Johns Hopkins Hospital, Hills entered private practice. During World War II, Hills served overseas with the U.S. Army's 18th General Hospital, and had the rank of Second Lieutenant when discharged.

== Athletics ==
Hills first joined an Olympic team at the 1920 Summer Olympics in Antwerp, Belgium. He won a succession of AAU and IC4A collegiate titles, both indoor and outdoor, each year he was at Princeton. In 1924, Hills represented the United States at the 1924 Summer Olympics in Paris, France, and won the bronze medal for the shot put competition.

== Death and legacy ==
Hills taught students, staff, and nurses throughout his career, at Johns Hopkins and Union Memorial Hospitals.

He died on September 20, 1977, from complications following a ruptured abdominal aneurysm. Hill's alma mater, The Hill School, inducted him to their Athletics Hall of Fame in 2012.

His first son, J. Dixon Hills, graduated from Princeton in 1954 and entered the medical profession like his father as a physician. His second son, Ralph Warren Hills (1939–2012), also attended Princeton and was a WBAL television producer in Baltimore.

== See also ==
- List of Princeton University Olympians
