= Julio Juaneda =

Argentine weightlifter

Julio Nilo Juaneda (born 1912, date of death unknown) is an Argentine weightlifter who competed in the 1932 Summer Olympics. He finished sixth in the middleweight class. He was born in Buenos Aires.
