= Narciso Costa =

Brazilian sprinter

Personal information
- Born: Narciso Valdares Costa; 21 June 1903 São Paulo, Brazil
- Died: 2 February 1966 (aged 62)

Sport
- Sport: Sprinting
- Event: 400 metres

Narciso Valdares Costa (21 June 1903 – 2 February 1966) was a Brazilian sprinter and middle-distance runner. Domestically, he represented Clube de Regatas Tietê and won multiple state and national titles. He had also set national records in the men's 400 metres, 800 metres, and 400 metres hurdles.

He was one of the first athletics competitors to compete for Brazil at the Olympics, doing so at the 1924 Summer Olympics. He competed in the men's 400 metres and men's 800 metres though failed to advance to the semifinals in both events. He later died on 2 February 1966.

== Biography ==
Narciso Valdares Costa was born on 21 June 1903 in São Paulo, Brazil. Domestically, he represented Clube de Regatas Tietê. As part of the club, he had set national records in the men's 400 metres, 800 metres, and 400 metres hurdles. He had also won gold medals at the São Paulo State Championships in all three events. Nationally, he won two gold medals in the 800 metres and one gold medal in the 400 metres at the Brazilian National Championships. He was also set to compete at a South American Championships in Athletics but did not start in his events.

Before the 1924 Summer Olympics in Paris, he and other members of the Brazilian national athletics team were coached by Alexander Hogarty in Brazil. They adopted "American" training methods and refrained from smoking and drinking. He and other members of the team were the first athletics competitors to compete for Brazil at an Olympic Games. At the 1924 Summer Games, he first competed in the heats of the men's 800 metres on 6 July. He competed in the fourth heat against six other athletes, placing sixth and not advancing to the semifinals. He then competed in the heats of the men's 400 metres four days later on 10 July. He ran in the third heat against four other athletes, placing third and against not advancing to the semifinals.

He was also entered to compete in the men's 100 metres and men's 200 metres but did not start in either event. In 1925, he set his personal bests in the 400 metres and 800 metres, with times of 50.2 seconds and 2:00.3, respectively. He later died on 2 February 1966 at the age of 62.
