= Charles Attenborough (weightlifter) =

British weightlifter

Personal information
- Full name: Charles Frederick Attenborough
- Nationality: British
- Born: 16 April 1902 Shardlow, England
- Died: 29 August 1961 (aged 59) Derby, England

Sport
- Sport: Weightlifting

Charles Frederick Attenborough (16 April 1902 – 29 August 1961) was a British weightlifter. He competed at the 1924 Summer Olympics and the 1928 Summer Olympics.
