= Marcel Van Der Goten =

Belgian weightlifter (1904–1941)

Maurice Philippe Georges Vandergoten
Personal information
- Nationality: Belgian
- Born: 7 February 1904; Anderlecht, Belgium
- Died: 16 December 1941 (aged 37); Uccle, German-occupied Belgium

Sport
- Sport: Weightlifting

Maurice Vandergoten (7 February 1904 – 16 December 1941) was a Belgian weightlifter. He competed at the 1924 Summer Olympics and the 1928 Summer Olympics.

Vandergoten was the brother of fellow Belgian weightlifter Jules Vandergoten.
