= Alfredo Pianta =

Argentine weightlifter

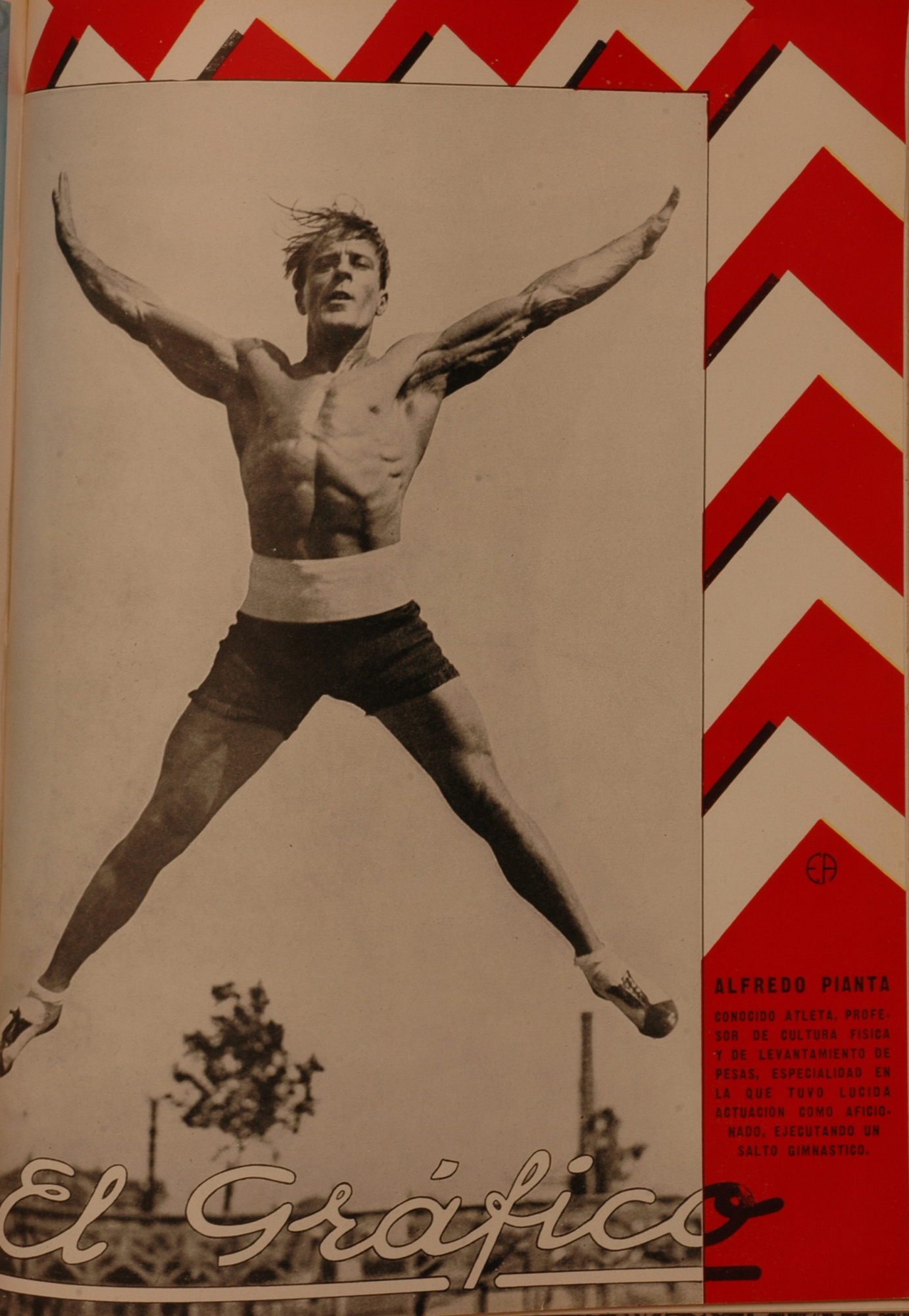
- Alfredo Pianta on the cover of a 1932 El Gráfico

Personal information
- Nationality: Argentine
- Born: 7 May 1901

Sport
- Sport: Weightlifting

Alfredo Pianta (born 7 May 1901, date of death unknown) was an Argentine weightlifter. He competed at the 1924 Summer Olympics and the 1928 Summer Olympics.
