= Roger François =

French weightlifter (1900–1949)

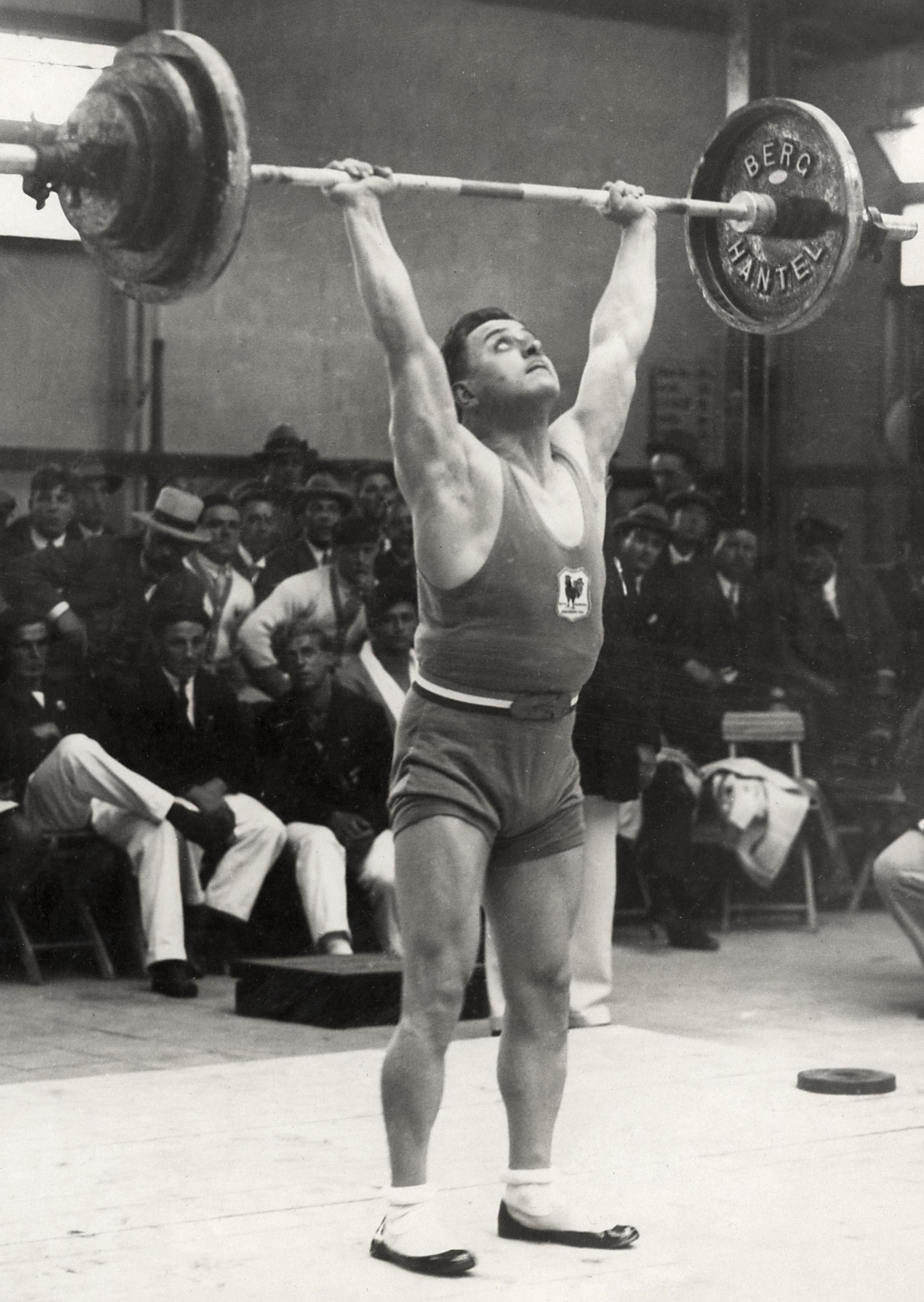
- Roger François at the 1928 Olympics

Personal information
- Born: 7 October 1900 Romans-sur-Isère, France
- Died: 15 February 1949 (aged 48) Paris, France
- Height: 1.67 m (5 ft 6 in)
- Weight: 73 kg (161 lb)

Sport
- Sport: Weightlifting
- Club: SA Montmartroise, Paris
Medal record
Olympic Games
Representing France
Gold medal – first place	1928 Amsterdam	-75 kg
World Championships
Gold medal – first place	1922 Tallinn	-82.5 kg

Roger François (7 October 1900 – 15 February 1949) was a French weightlifter. He competed at the 1924, 1928 and 1932 Summer Olympics in the middleweight category (under 75 kg) and finished in sixth, first and fourth place, respectively. François won the world title in 1922 and set seven world records between 1922 and 1928: two in the press, four in the snatch, and one in the total lift. Four of those records were unofficial.
