= Rudolf Edinger =

Austrian weightlifter (1902–1997)

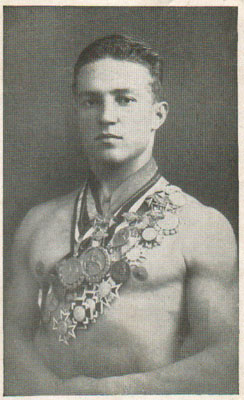
- Rudolf Edinger in 1924

Personal information
- Born: 22 November 1902 Vienna, Austria
- Died: 4 May 1997 (aged 94) Brunn am Gebirge, Austria
- Height: 1.64 m (5 ft 5 in)
- Weight: 72 kg (159 lb)

Sport
- Sport: Weightlifting
Medal record
Representing Austria
World Championships
Gold medal – first place	1923 Vienna	Lightweight

Rudolf Edinger (22 November 1902 – 4 May 1997) was an Austrian weightlifter. He won a world title in the lightweight (under 67.5 kg) category in 1923 and set two world records in press in 1926 and 1927. He competed at the 1924 Summer Olympics as middleweight and finished in 24th place.
