= Josef Zeman (weightlifter) =

Austrian weightlifter (1906–1992)

Personal information
- Born: 8 June 1906; Vienna, Austria
- Died: November 1992 (aged 86)
- Weight: 94 kg (207 lb)

Sport
- Country: Austria
- Sport: Weightlifting
- Weight class: Light-Heavyweight; Heavyweight
- Updated on 12 December 2016

Josef Zeman (8 June 1906 – November 1992) was an Austrian male weightlifter who represented Austria at international competitions. He competed at the 1928 Summer Olympics in the Light-Heavyweight event and at the 1936 Summer Olympics in the Heavyweight event, finishing in 6th place.
