= Pierre Vibert =

French weightlifter

Personal information
- Nationality: French
- Born: 15 March 1895 Rochefort, France
- Died: 16 February 1983 (aged 87) Les Reys de Saulce, France

Sport
- Sport: Weightlifting

Achievements and titles
- Olympic finals: 1924 Summer Olympics; 1928 Summer Olympics

Pierre Vibert (15 March 1895 – 16 February 1983) was a French weightlifter. He competed at the 1924 Summer Olympics and the 1928 Summer Olympics.
