= Karl Bierwirth =

German weightlifter

Personal information
- Born: 24 September 1907; Essen, Germany
- Died: 3 May 1955 (aged 47); Bonn

Sport
- Country: Germany
- Sport: Weightlifting
- Weight class: Light-Heavyweight
- Club: ASV Siegfried Essen
- Updated on 12 December 2016

Karl Bierwirth (24 September 1907 – 3 May 1955) was a German male weightlifter, who competed in the Light-Heavyweight category and represented Germany at international competitions. He competed at the 1928 Summer Olympics.
