= Octávio Zani =

Brazilian athlete

Personal information
- Nationality: Brazilian
- Born: 1 January 1902
- Died: 16 November 1967 (aged 65)

Sport
- Sport: Athletics
- Event(s): Shot put Discus; Hammer

Octávio Zani (1 January 1902 – 16 November 1967) was a Brazilian athlete. He competed in three events at the 1924 Summer Olympics.
