= Carlo Galimberti =

Argentine-born Italian weightlifter (1894–1939)

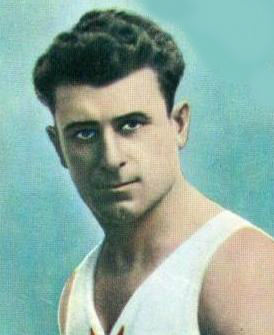

Personal information
- Born: 2 July 1894 Rosario, Santa Fe, Argentina
- Died: 10 August 1939 (aged 45) Milan, Italy
Medal record
Men's weightlifting
Representing Italy
Olympic Games
Gold medal – first place	1924 Paris	-75 kg
Silver medal – second place	1928 Amsterdam	-75 kg
Silver medal – second place	1932 Los Angeles	-75 kg

Carlo Galimberti (2 July 1894 – 10 August 1939) was an Argentine-born Italian weightlifter who competed in the 1924 Summer Olympics, in the 1928 Summer Olympics and in the 1932 Summer Olympics. He medaled at each of his Olympic appearances. He died in 1939 from burns sustained in a boiler explosion five days earlier while serving as a firefighter. Two other firefighters also died.

== Biography ==
Galimberti grew up in Rosario, Argentina, as the son of Italian immigrants, and came back to Milan, Italy, after the First World War. He won a gold medal in the middleweight class in 1924, a silver medal in the same class in 1928 and another silver medal in the middleweight class in 1932.

== See also ==
- Walk of Fame of Italian sport

Summer Olympics
Preceded by Ugo Frigerio	Flag bearer for Italy; 1928 Amsterdam	Succeeded by Ugo Frigerio
