= Fencing at the 1920 Summer Olympics – Men's épée =

Men's épée at the Games of the VII Olympiad
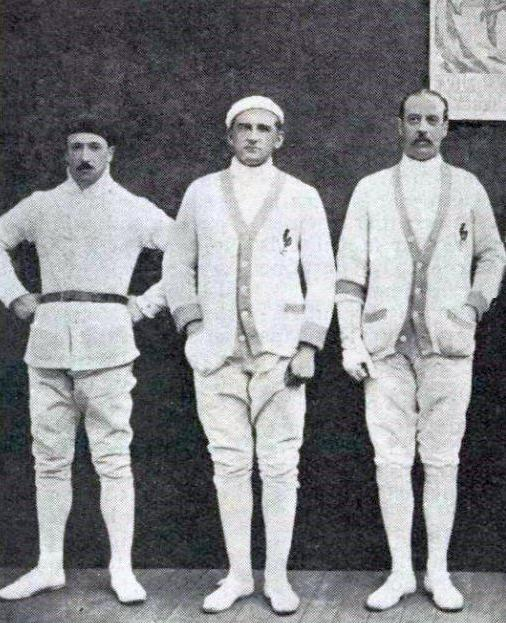
- French épéeists: silver medalist Alexandre Lippmann, bronze medalist Gustave Buchard, and gold medalist Armand Massard
- Venue: Gardens de la Palace d'Egmont
- Dates: August 20–23, 1920
- Competitors: 80 from 13 nations

Medalists
1st place, gold medalist(s)		Armand Massard; France
2nd place, silver medalist(s)		Alexandre Lippmann; France
3rd place, bronze medalist(s)		Gustave Buchard; France

The men's épée was a fencing event held as part of the fencing at the 1920 Summer Olympics programme in Antwerp, Belgium. It was the fifth appearance of the event. A total of 80 fencers from 13 nations competed in the event, which was held from August 20 to 23, 1920. Each nation was limited to eight fencers, down from 12 in 1908 and 1912. Of the six fencing events, the only one in which Nedo Nadi did not win a gold medal was the one in which he did not compete. Instead, a trio of Frenchmen (Armand Massard, Alexandre Lippmann, and Gustave Buchard) swept the medals. It was Lippmann's second silver medal in the event, he having previously taken second in 1908; he was the second man to win multiple medals in the individual épée.

== Background ==
This was the fifth appearance of the event, which was not held at the first Games in 1896 (with only foil and sabre events held) but has been held at every Summer Olympics since 1900.

Four of the eight finalists from the 1912 Games returned: silver medalist Ivan Joseph Martin Osiier of Denmark (who competed in seven Games from 1908 to 1948), fourth-place finisher Victor Boin of Belgium, seventh-place finisher Léon Tom of Belgium, and eighth-place finisher Martin Holt of Great Britain. The French and Italian teams, both of whom boycotted the 1912 Games over separate rules disputes, returned, including 1908 silver medalist Alexandre Lippmann.

Czechoslovakia and Egypt each made their debut in the event. Belgium, Great Britain, and the United States each appeared for the fourth time, tied for most among nations.

== Competition format ==
The competition was held over four rounds. In each round, each pool held a round-robin, with bouts to 1 touch. Double-touches counted as touches against both fencers. Rather than hold separate barrages to separate fencers tied in the advancement spot (as had been done in 1908), the head-to-head results of bouts already fenced were used (as in 1912). The size of the pools was increased; where previously the maximum size of a pool was 8, now the final and semifinals consisted of 12 fencers each with the quarterfinals and first round pools also larger.

- First round: 9 pools of between 8 and 10 fencers each. The 5 fencers in each pool with the fewest touches against advanced to the quarterfinals.
- Second round: 4 pools of 11 or 12 fencers each. The 6 fencers in each pool with the fewest touches against advanced to the semifinals.
- Semifinals: 2 pools of 12 fencers each. The 6 fencers in each pool with the fewest touches against advanced to the final.
- Final: 1 pool of 12 fencers.

== Schedule ==
Date	Time	Round
Friday, 20 August 1920	9:00	Round 1
Sunday, 22 August 1920	9:00	Quarterfinals; Semifinals
Monday, 23 August 1920	9:30	Final

== Results ==
=== First round ===
==== Pool A ====
Rank	Fencer	Nation	Wins	Losses	Notes
1	Félix Goblet	Belgium	8	1	Q
2	João Sassetti	Portugal	6	3	Q
3	Roger Ducret	France	5	4	Q
3	Gustaf Lindblom	Sweden	5	4	Q
5	S. Antonidas	Greece	4	5	Q
6	John Blake	Great Britain	4	5	
7	Willem Hubert	Netherlands	3	6	
7	Ivan Osiier	Denmark	3	6	
7	Paolo Thaon	Italy	3	6	
10	Jan Černohorský	Czechoslovakia	1	8	

==== Pool B ====
Rank	Fencer	Nation	Wins	Losses	Notes
1	Jan Van der Wiel	Netherlands	5	2	Q
2	António de Menezes	Portugal	4	3	Q
2	Evangelos Skotidas	Greece	4	3	Q
2	Maurice de Wée	Belgium	4	3	Q
5	Roland Willoughby	Great Britain	3	4	Q
6	Kay Schrøder	Denmark	3	4	
7	Frédéric Fitting	Switzerland	2	5	
7	Bertil Uggla	Sweden	2	5	

==== Pool C ====
Olivier advanced to the final after Otto Baerentzen (5th in Pool I) withdrew.

Rank	Fencer	Nation	Wins	Losses	Notes
1	Fernando Correia	Portugal	5	2	Q
1	Georges Trombert	France	5	2	Q
3	Victor Boin	Belgium	4	2	Q
3	Einar Levison	Denmark	4	2	Q
5	Wouter Brouwer	Netherlands	3	3	Q
6	Abelardo Olivier	Italy	3	3	q
7	John Dimond	United States	2	4	
7	Hans Törnblom	Sweden	2	4	

==== Pool D ====
Rank	Fencer	Nation	Wins	Losses	Notes
1	Frédéric Dubourdieu	France	7	2	Q
2	Poul Rasmussen	Denmark	6	3	Q
3	Edouard Fitting	Switzerland	5	4	Q
4	Ernest Gevers	Belgium	4	5	Q
5	Carl Gripenstedt	Sweden	4	5	Q
6	Frederico Paredes	Portugal	4	5	
7	Louis Delaunoij	Netherlands	3	6	
7	Raymond Dutcher	United States	3	6	
7	Robert Montgomerie	Great Britain	3	6	
10	Josef Javůrek	Czechoslovakia	2	7	

==== Pool E ====
Rank	Fencer	Nation	Wins	Losses	Notes
1	Nils Hellsten	Sweden	6	2	Q
2	Ruimondo Mayer	Portugal	5	3	Q
3	Joseph de Craecker	Belgium	4	4	Q
3	Otakar Švorčík	Czechoslovakia	4	4	Q
3	Alexandre Lippmann	France	4	4	Q
6	Eugène Empeyta	Switzerland	3	5	
7	Martin Holt	Great Britain	3	5	
8	Georg Hegner	Denmark	1	7	
8	Vasilios Zarkadis	Greece	1	7	

==== Pool F ====
Rank	Fencer	Nation	Wins	Losses	Notes
1	Gustave Buchard	France	6	1	Q
2	Tullio Bozza	Italy	5	2	Q
3	Henri Wijnoldij-Daniëls	Netherlands	4	3	Q
4	Aage Berntsen	Denmark	3	4	Q
4	William Russell	United States	3	4	Q
6	Knut Enell	Sweden	2	5	
7	Léon Tom	Belgium	2	5	
8	George Burt	Great Britain	1	6	

==== Pool G ====
Rank	Fencer	Nation	Wins	Losses	Notes
1	Henry Breckinridge	United States	6	2	Q
1	Charles Delporte	Belgium	6	2	Q
1	Louis Moureau	France	6	2	Q
4	Jorge de Paiva	Portugal	5	3	Q
5	Josef Jungmann	Czechoslovakia	4	4	Q
6	Aldo Boni	Italy	3	5	
7	Salomon Zeldenrust	Netherlands	3	5	
8	Charles Notley	Great Britain	2	6	
9	Einar Råberg	Sweden	0	8	

==== Pool H ====
Rank	Fencer	Nation	Wins	Losses	Notes
1	Fernand de Montigny	Belgium	7	1	Q
2	Georges Casanova	France	6	2	Q
2	Adrianus de Jong	Netherlands	6	2	Q
4	Henrique da Silveira	Portugal	5	3	Q
5	Giovanni Canova	Italy	3	5	Q
6	David Warholm	Sweden	3	5	
7	Ronald Bruce Campbell	Great Britain	3	5	
8	Henri Jacquet	Switzerland	2	6	
9	Viliam Tvrský	Czechoslovakia	1	7	

==== Pool I ====
Rank	Fencer	Nation	Wins	Losses	Notes
1	Armand Massard	France	6	2	Q
2	Ahmed Hassanein	Egypt	5	3	Q
2	Dino Urbani	Italy	5	3	Q
4	Robin Dalglish	Great Britain	4	4	Q
5	Otto Baerentzen	Denmark	4	4	Q, withdrew
6	Louis de Tribolet	Switzerland	3	5	
7	Manuel Queiróz	Portugal	3	5	
8	Félix Vigeveno	Netherlands	2	6	
9	Leonard Schoonmaker	United States	0	8	

=== Quarterfinals ===
==== Quarterfinal A ====
Rank	Fencer	Nation	Wins	Losses	Notes
1	Georges Trombert	France	8	2	Q
2	Gustaf Lindblom	Sweden	7	3	Q
2	Jorge de Paiva	Portugal	7	3	Q
4	Adrianus de Jong	Netherlands	6	4	Q
4	Louis Moureau	France	6	4	Q
6	Charles Delporte	Belgium	5	5	Q
7	Tullio Bozza	Italy	5	5	
7	Joseph de Craecker	Belgium	5	5	
9	Poul Rasmussen	Denmark	4	6	
10	Roland Willoughby	Great Britain	2	8	
11	Otakar Švorčík	Czechoslovakia	1	9	

==== Quarterfinal B ====
Rank	Fencer	Nation	Wins	Losses	Notes
1	Abelardo Olivier	Italy	7	3	Q
2	Fernando Correia	Portugal	6	4	Q
2	Frédéric Dubourdieu	France	6	4	Q
2	Armand Massard	France	6	4	Q
5	Henry Breckenridge	United States	5	3	Q
5	Félix Goblet	Belgium	5	3	Q
7	Ahmed Hassanein	Egypt	4	6	
7	Ruimondo Mayer	Portugal	4	6	
7	Henri Wijnoldij-Daniëls	Netherlands	4	6	
10	Carl Gripenstedt	Sweden	3	7	
11	Josef Jungmann	Czechoslovakia	1	9	

==== Quarterfinal C ====
Rank	Fencer	Nation	Wins	Losses	Notes
1	João Sassetti	Portugal	8	3	Q
2	António de Menezes	Portugal	7	4	Q
3	Gustave Buchard	France	6	5	Q
3	Ernest Gevers	Belgium	6	5	Q
3	William Russell	United States	6	5	Q
3	Maurice de Wée	Belgium	6	5	Q
7	Giovanni Canova	Italy	5	6	
7	Roger Ducret	France	5	6	
7	Evangelos Skotidas	Greece	5	6	
10	Aage Berntsen	Denmark	4	7	
11	S. Antonidas	Greece	3	8	
12	Jan Van der Wiel	Netherlands	1	10	

==== Quarterfinal D ====
Rank	Fencer	Nation	Wins	Losses	Notes
1	Nils Hellsten	Sweden	8	2	Q
2	Alexandre Lippmann	France	7	3	Q
3	Georges Casanova	France	6	4	Q
3	Einar Levison	Denmark	6	4	Q
3	Fernand de Montigny	Belgium	6	4	Q
3	Dino Urbani	Italy	6	4	Q
7	Henrique da Silveira	Portugal	4	6	
8	Victor Boin	Belgium	3	7	
8	Wouter Brouwer	Netherlands	3	7	
8	Edouard Fitting	Switzerland	3	7	
11	Robin Dalglish	Great Britain	1	9	

=== Semifinals ===
==== Semifinal A ====
Rank	Fencer	Nation	Wins	Losses	Notes
1	Georges Casanova	France	9	2	Q
2	António de Menezes	Portugal	7	4	Q
3	Gustaf Lindblom	Sweden	6	5	Q
3	Armand Massard	France	6	5	Q
5	Charles Delporte	Belgium	4	7	Q
5	Alexandre Lippmann	France	4	7	Q
7	Frédéric Dubourdieu	France	4	7	
7	Fernand de Montigny	Belgium	4	7	
7	Dino Urbani	Italy	4	7	
10	Fernando Correia	Portugal	2	9	
10	William Russell	United States	2	9	
12	Einar Levison	Denmark	0	11	

==== Semifinal B ====
Rank	Fencer	Nation	Wins	Losses	Notes
1	Ernest Gevers	Belgium	7	4	Q
2	Gustave Buchard	France	6	5	Q
2	Félix Goblet	Belgium	6	5	Q
2	Louis Moureau	France	6	5	Q
2	Abelardo Olivier	Italy	6	5	Q
2	Jorge de Paiva	Portugal	6	5	Q
7	Georges Trombert	France	6	5	
8	Nils Hellsten	Sweden	4	7	
8	Adrianus de Jong	Netherlands	4	7	
10	Henry Breckenridge	United States	3	8	
10	Maurice de Wée	Belgium	3	8	
12	João Sassetti	Portugal	2	9	

=== Final ===
Rank	Fencer	Nation	Wins	Losses
1st place, gold medalist(s)	Armand Massard	France	9	2
2nd place, silver medalist(s)	Alexandre Lippmann	France	7	4
3rd place, bronze medalist(s)	Gustave Buchard	France	6	5
4	Ernest Gevers	Belgium	6	5
5	Georges Casanova	France	5	6
6	António de Menezes	Portugal	5	6
6	Louis Moureau	France	5	6
6	Abelardo Olivier	Italy	5	6
9	Gustaf Lindblom	Sweden	4	7
10	Charles Delporte	Belgium	3	8
10	Félix Goblet	Belgium	3	8
12	Jorge de Paiva	Portugal	2	9

== Results summary ==
Rank	Fencer	Nation	Round 1			Quarterfinals			Semifinals			Final		Total	
Rank	Fencer	Nation	W	L	Rank	W	L	Rank	W	L	Rank	W	L	W	L
1st place, gold medalist(s)	Armand Massard	France	6	2	1st	6	4	2nd	6	5	3rd	9	2	27	13
2nd place, silver medalist(s)	Alexandre Lippmann	France	4	4	3rd	7	3	2nd	4	7	5th	7	4	22	18
3rd place, bronze medalist(s)	Gustave Buchard	France	6	1	1st	6	5	3rd	6	5	2nd	6	5	24	16
4	Ernest Gevers	Belgium	4	5	4th	6	5	3rd	7	4	1st	6	5	23	19
5	Georges Casanova	France	6	2	2nd	6	4	3rd	9	2	1st	5	6	26	14
6	António de Menezes	Portugal	4	3	2nd	7	4	2nd	7	4	2nd	5	6	23	17
6	Louis Moureau	France	6	2	1st	6	4	4th	6	5	2nd	5	6	23	17
6	Abelardo Olivier	Italy	3	3	6th	7	3	1st	6	5	2nd	5	6	21	17
9	Gustaf Lindblom	Sweden	5	4	3rd	7	3	2nd	6	5	3rd	4	7	22	19
10	Charles Delporte	Belgium	6	2	1st	5	5	6th	4	7	5th	3	8	18	22
10	Félix Goblet d'Alviella	Belgium	8	1	1st	5	3	5th	6	5	2nd	3	8	22	17
12	Jorge de Paiva	Portugal	5	3	4th	7	3	2nd	6	5	2nd	2	9	20	20
13	Frédéric Dubourdieu	France	7	2	1st	6	4	2nd	4	7	7th	Did not advance		17	13
13	Fernand de Montigny	Belgium	7	1	1st	6	4	3rd	4	7	7th	Did not advance		17	12
13	Georges Trombert	France	5	2	1st	8	2	1st	6	5	7th	Did not advance		19	9
13	Dino Urbani	Italy	5	3	2nd	6	4	3rd	4	7	7th	Did not advance		15	14
17	Nils Hellsten	Sweden	6	2	1st	8	2	1st	4	7	8th	Did not advance		18	11
17	Adrianus de Jong	Netherlands	6	2	2nd	6	4	4th	4	7	8th	Did not advance		16	13
19	Henry Skillman Breckinridge	United States	6	2	1st	5	3	5th	3	8	10th	Did not advance		14	13
19	Fernando Correia	Portugal	5	2	1st	6	4	2nd	2	9	10th	Did not advance		13	15
19	Maurice de Wée	Belgium	4	3	2nd	6	5	3rd	3	8	10th	Did not advance		13	16
19	William Russell	United States	3	4	4th	6	5	3rd	2	9	10th	Did not advance		11	18
23	Ejnar Levison	Denmark	4	2	3rd	6	4	3rd	0	11	12th	Did not advance		10	17
23	João Sassetti	Portugal	6	3	2nd	8	3	1st	2	9	12th	Did not advance		16	15
25	Tullio Bozza	Italy	5	2	2nd	5	5	7th	Did not advance					10	7
25	Giovanni Canova	Italy	3	5	5th	5	6	7th	Did not advance					8	11
25	Joseph De Craecker	Belgium	4	4	3rd	5	5	7th	Did not advance					9	9
25	Roger Ducret	France	5	4	3rd	5	6	7th	Did not advance					10	10
25	Ahmed Hassanein	Egypt	5	3	2nd	4	6	7th	Did not advance					9	9
25	Ruimondo Mayer	Portugal	5	3	2nd	4	6	7th	Did not advance					9	9
25	Henrique da Silveira	Portugal	5	3	4th	4	6	7th	Did not advance					9	9
25	Evangelos Skotidas	Greece	4	3	2nd	5	6	7th	Did not advance					9	9
25	Henri Wijnoldy-Daniëls	Netherlands	4	3	3rd	4	6	7th	Did not advance					8	9
34	Victor Boin	Belgium	4	2	3rd	3	7	8th	Did not advance					7	9
34	Wouter Brouwer	Netherlands	3	3	5th	3	7	8th	Did not advance					6	10
34	Édouard Fitting	Switzerland	5	4	3rd	3	7	8th	Did not advance					8	11
37	Poul Rasmussen	Denmark	6	3	2nd	4	6	9th	Did not advance					10	9
38	Aage Berntsen	Denmark	3	4	4th	4	7	10th	Did not advance					7	11
38	Carl Gripenstedt	Sweden	4	5	5th	3	7	10th	Did not advance					7	12
38	Roland Willoughby	Great Britain	3	4	5th	2	8	10th	Did not advance					5	12
41	S. Antonidas	Greece	4	5	5th	3	8	11th	Did not advance					7	13
41	Robin Dalglish	Great Britain	4	4	4th	1	9	11th	Did not advance					5	13
41	Josef Jungmann	Czechoslovakia	4	4	5th	1	9	11th	Did not advance					5	13
41	Otakar Švorčík	Czechoslovakia	4	4	4th	1	9	11th	Did not advance					5	13
45	Jan Van der Wiel	Netherlands	5	2	1st	1	10	12th	Did not advance					6	12
46	Otto Bærentzen	Denmark	4	4	5th	DNS			Did not advance					4	4
47	J. P. Blake	Great Britain	4	5	6th	Did not advance								4	5
47	Aldo Boni	Italy	3	5	6th	Did not advance								3	5
47	Eugène Empeyta	Switzerland	3	5	6th	Did not advance								3	5
47	Knut Enell	Sweden	2	5	6th	Did not advance								2	5
47	Frederico Paredes	Portugal	4	5	6th	Did not advance								4	5
47	Kay Schrøder	Denmark	3	4	6th	Did not advance								3	4
47	Louis de Tribolet	Switzerland	3	5	6th	Did not advance								3	5
47	David Warholm	Sweden	3	5	6th	Did not advance								3	5
55	Ronald Bruce Campbell	Great Britain	3	5	7th	Did not advance								3	5
55	Louis Delaunoij	Netherlands	3	6	7th	Did not advance								3	6
55	John Dimond	United States	2	4	7th	Did not advance								2	4
55	Raymond Dutcher	United States	3	6	7th	Did not advance								3	6
55	Frédéric Fitting	Switzerland	2	5	7th	Did not advance								2	5
55	Martin Holt	Great Britain	3	5	7th	Did not advance								3	5
55	Willem Hubert	Netherlands	3	6	7th	Did not advance								3	6
55	Robert Montgomerie	Great Britain	3	6	7th	Did not advance								3	6
55	Ivan Osiier	Denmark	3	6	7th	Did not advance								3	6
55	Manuel Queiróz	Portugal	3	5	7th	Did not advance								3	5
55	Paolo Thaon	Italy	3	6	7th	Did not advance								3	6
55	Léon Tom	Belgium	2	5	7th	Did not advance								2	5
55	Hans Törnblom	Sweden	2	4	7th	Did not advance								2	4
55	Bertil Uggla	Sweden	2	5	7th	Did not advance								2	5
55	Salomon Zeldenrust	Netherlands	3	5	7th	Did not advance								3	5
70	George Burt	Great Britain	1	6	8th	Did not advance								1	6
70	Georg Hegner	Denmark	1	7	8th	Did not advance								1	7
70	Henri Jacquet	Switzerland	2	6	8th	Did not advance								2	6
70	Charles Notley	Great Britain	2	6	8th	Did not advance								2	6
70	Félix Vigeveno	Netherlands	2	6	8th	Did not advance								2	6
70	Vasilios Zarkadis	Greece	1	7	8th	Did not advance								1	7
76	Einar Råberg	Sweden	0	8	9th	Did not advance								0	8
76	Leon Schoonmaker	United States	0	8	9th	Did not advance								0	8
76	Viliam Tvrský	Czechoslovakia	1	7	9th	Did not advance								1	7
79	Jan Černohorský	Czechoslovakia	1	8	10th	Did not advance								1	8
79	Josef Javůrek	Czechoslovakia	2	7	10th	Did not advance								2	7
