= List of Olympic medalists in fencing (men) =

This is the complete list of men's Olympic medalists in fencing.

== Current program ==
=== Foil, individual ===
Games	Gold	Silver	Bronze
1896 Athens	Eugène-Henri Gravelotte; France	Henri Callot; France	Periklis Pierrakos-Mavromichalis; Greece
1896 Athens	Eugène-Henri Gravelotte; France	Henri Callot; France	Athanasios Vouros; Greece
1900 Paris	Émile Coste; France	Henri Masson; France	Marcel Boulenger; France
1904 St. Louis	Ramón Fonst; Cuba	Albertson Van Zo Post; United States	Charles Tatham; United States
1908 London	not included in the Olympic program		
1912 Stockholm	Nedo Nadi; Italy	Pietro Speciale; Italy	Richard Verderber; Austria
1920 Antwerp	Nedo Nadi; Italy	Philippe Cattiau; France	Roger Ducret; France
1924 Paris	Roger Ducret; France	Philippe Cattiau; France	Maurice Van Damme; Belgium
1928 Amsterdam	Lucien Gaudin; France	Erwin Casmir; Germany	Giulio Gaudini; Italy
1932 Los Angeles	Gustavo Marzi; Italy	Joseph Levis; United States	Giulio Gaudini; Italy
1936 Berlin	Giulio Gaudini; Italy	Edward Gardère; France	Giorgio Bocchino; Italy
1948 London	Jehan Buhan; France	Christian d'Oriola; France	Lajos Maszlay; Hungary
1952 Helsinki	Christian d'Oriola; France	Edoardo Mangiarotti; Italy	Manlio Di Rosa; Italy
1956 Melbourne	Christian d'Oriola; France	Giancarlo Bergamini; Italy	Antonio Spallino; Italy
1960 Rome	Viktor Zhdanovich; Soviet Union	Yuri Sisikin; Soviet Union	Albert Axelrod; United States
1964 Tokyo	Egon Franke; Poland	Jean Claude Magnan; France	Daniel Revenu; France
1968 Mexico City	Ion Drîmbă; Romania	Jenő Kamuti; Hungary	Daniel Revenu; France
1972 Munich	Witold Woyda; Poland	Jenő Kamuti; Hungary	Christian Noël; France
1976 Montreal	Fabio Dal Zotto; Italy	Alexandr Romankov; Soviet Union	Bernard Talvard; France
1980 Moscow	Vladimir Smirnov; Soviet Union	Pascal Jolyot; France	Alexandr Romankov; Soviet Union
1984 Los Angeles	Mauro Numa; Italy	Matthias Behr; West Germany	Stefano Cerioni; Italy
1988 Seoul	Stefano Cerioni; Italy	Udo Wagner; East Germany	Alexandr Romankov; Soviet Union
1992 Barcelona	Philippe Omnès; France	Sergei Golubitsky; Unified Team	Elvis Gregory; Cuba
1996 Atlanta	Alessandro Puccini; Italy	Lionel Plumenail; France	Franck Boidin; France
2000 Sydney	Kim Young-ho; South Korea	Ralf Bissdorf; Germany	Dmitriy Shevchenko; Russia
2004 Athens	Brice Guyart; France	Salvatore Sanzo; Italy	Andrea Cassarà; Italy
2008 Beijing	Benjamin Kleibrink; Germany	Yuki Ota; Japan	Salvatore Sanzo; Italy
2012 London	Lei Sheng; China	Alaaeldin Abouelkassem; Egypt	Choi Byung-chul; South Korea
2016 Rio de Janeiro	Daniele Garozzo; Italy	Alexander Massialas; United States	Timur Safin; Russia
2020 Tokyo	Cheung Ka Long; Hong Kong	Daniele Garozzo; Italy	Alexander Choupenitch; Czech Republic
2024 Paris	Cheung Ka Long; Hong Kong	Filippo Macchi; Italy	Nick Itkin; United States
2028 Los Angeles			

=== Foil, team ===
Games	Gold	Silver	Bronze
1904 St. Louis	Mixed team Ramón Fonst; Albertson Van Zo Post; Manuel Díaz	United States; Charles Tatham; Charles Townsend; Arthur Fox	None awarded
1908–1912	not included in the Olympic program		
1920 Antwerp	Italy; Aldo Nadi; Nedo Nadi; Abelardo Olivier; Pietro Speciale; Rodolfo Terlizzi; Oreste Puliti; Tommaso Costantino; Baldo Baldi	France; André Labatut; Georges Trombert; Marcel Perrot; Lucien Gaudin; Philippe Cattiau; Roger Ducret; Gaston Amson; Lionel Bony de Castellane	United States; Francis Honeycutt; Arthur Lyon; Robert Sears; Henry Breckinridge; Harold Rayner
1924 Paris	France; Lucien Gaudin; Philippe Cattiau; Jacques Coutrot; Roger Ducret; Henri Jobier; André Labatut; Guy de Luget; Joseph Perotaux	Belgium; Désire Beurain; Charles Crahay; Fernand de Montigny; Maurice Van Damme; Marcel Berré; Albert de Roocker	Hungary; László Berti; Sándor Pósta; Zoltán Ozoray Schenker; Ödön Tersztyánszky; István Lichteneckert
1928 Amsterdam	Italy; Ugo Pignotti; Giulio Gaudini; Giorgio Pessina; Gioacchino Guaragna; Oreste Puliti; Giorgio Chiavacci	France; Philippe Cattiau; Roger Ducret; André Labatut; Lucien Gaudin; Raymond Flacher; André Gaboriaud	Argentina; Roberto Larraz; Raul Anganuzzi; Luis Lucchetti; Hector Lucchetti; Carmelo Camet
1932 Los Angeles	France; Edward Gardère; René Bondoux; René Bougnol; René Lemoine; Philippe Cattiau; Jean Piot	Italy; Giulio Gaudini; Gustavo Marzi; Ugo Pignotti; Gioacchino Guaragna; Rodolfo Terlizzi; Giorgio Pessina	United States; George Charles Calnan; Richard Clarke Steere; Joseph Levis; Dernell Every; Hugh Vincent Alessandroni; Frank Righeimer
1936 Berlin	Italy; Giorgio Bocchino; Manlio Di Rosa; Gioacchino Guaragna; Ciro Verratti; Giulio Gaudini; Gustavo Marzi	France; Edward Gardère; André Gardère; Jacques Coutrot; René Bougnol; René Bondoux; René Lemoine	Germany; Siegfried Lerdon; August Heim; Erwin Casmir; Julius Eisenecker; Stefan Rosenbauer; Otto Adam
1948 London	France; Adrien Rommel; Christian d'Oriola; André Bonin; Jacques Lataste; Jehan Buhan; René Bougnol	Italy; Saverio Ragno; Renzo Nostini; Manlio Di Rosa; Giorgio Pellini; Edoardo Mangiarotti; Giuliano Nostini	Belgium; André Van De Werve De Vorsselaer; Paul Louis Jean Valcke; Raymond Bru; Georges Camille De Bourgignon; Henri Paternoster; Edouard Yves
1952 Helsinki	France; Christian d'Oriola; Jacques Lataste; Jehan Buhan; Claude Netter; Jacques Noël; Adrien Rommel	Italy; Giancarlo Bergamini; Antonio Spallino; Manlio Di Rosa; Giorgio Pellini; Edoardo Mangiarotti; Renzo Nostini	Hungary; Endre Palócz; Tibor Berczelly; Endre Tilli; Aladár Gerevich; József Sákovics; Lajos Maszlay
1956 Melbourne	Italy; Vittorio Lucarelli; Luigi Carpaneda; Manlio Di Rosa; Giancarlo Bergamini; Antonio Spallino; Edoardo Mangiarotti	France; Bernard Baudoux; Rene Coicaud; Claude Netter; Roger Closset; Christian d'Oriola; Jacques Lataste	Hungary; Lajos Somodi; József Gyuricza; Endre Tilli; József Marosi; Mihály Fülöp; József Sákovics
1960 Rome	Soviet Union; Viktor Zhdanovich; Mark Midler; Yury Rudov; Yury Sisikin; German Sveshnikov	Italy; Alberto Pellegrino; Luigi Carpaneda; Mario Culetto; Aldo Aureggi; Edoardo Mangiarotti	United Team of Germany; Jürgen Theuerkauff; Tim Gerresheim; Eberhard Mehl; Jürgen Brecht
1964 Tokyo	Soviet Union; Viktor Zhdanovich; Yury Sharov; Yury Sisikin; German Sveshnikov; Mark Midler	Poland; Witold Woyda; Zbigniew Skrudlik; Ryszard Parulski; Egon Franke; Janusz Rozycki	France; Jacky Courtillat; Jean-Claude Magnan; Christian Noël; Daniel Revenu; Pierre Rodocanachi
1968 Mexico City	France; Daniel Revenu; Gilles Berolatti; Christian Noël; Jean-Claude Magnan; Jacques Dimont	Soviet Union; German Sveshnikov; Yury Sharov; Vasili Stankovich; Viktor Putyatin; Yury Sisikin	Poland; Witold Woyda; Zbigniew Skrudlik; Ryszard Parulski; Egon Franke; Adam Lisewski
1972 Munich	Poland; Marek Dąbrowski; Jerzy Kaczmarek; Lech Koziejowski; Witold Woyda; Arkadiusz Godel	Soviet Union; Vladimir Denisov; Anatoli Kotetsev; Leonid Romanov; Vasili Stankovich; Viktor Putyatin	France; Jean-Claude Magnan; Christian Noël; Daniel Revenu; Bernard Talvard; Gilles Berolatti
1976 Montreal	West Germany; Matthias Behr; Thomas Bach; Harald Hein; Klaus Reichert; Erk Sens-Gorius	Italy; Fabio Dal Zotto; Carlo Montano; Stefano Simoncelli; Giovanni Battista Coletti; Attilio Calatroni	France; Christian Noël; Bernard Talvard; Didier Flament; Frédéric Pietruszka; Daniel Revenu
1980 Moscow	France; Didier Flament; Pascal Jolyot; Bruno Boscherie; Philippe Bonnin; Frédéric Pietruszka	Soviet Union; Alexandr Romankov; Vladimir Smirnov; Sarbizhan Ruziev; Ashot Karagian; Vladimir Lapitsky	Poland; Adam Robak; Bogusław Zych; Lech Koziejowski; Marian Sypniewski
1984 Los Angeles	Italy; Mauro Numa; Andrea Borella; Stefano Cerioni; Angelo Scuri; Andrea Cipressa	West Germany; Matthias Behr; Matthias Gey; Harald Hein; Frank Beck; Klaus Reichert	France; Philippe Omnès; Patrick Groc; Frederic Pietruszka; Pascal Jolyot; Marc Cerboni
1988 Seoul	Soviet Union; Vladimer Aptsiauri; Anvar Ibragimov; Boris Koretsky; Ilgar Mammadov; Alexandr Romankov	West Germany; Matthias Behr; Thomas Endres; Matthias Gey; Ulrich Schreck; Thorsten Wiedner	Hungary; István Busa; Zsolt Érsek; Róbert Gátai; Pál Szekeres; István Szelei
1992 Barcelona	Germany; Udo Wagner; Ulrich Schreck; Thorsten Weidner; Alexander Koch; Ingo Weißenborn	Cuba; Elvis Gregory; Guillermo Betancourt Scull; Oscar García Perez; Tulio Diaz Babier; Hermenegildo Garcia Marturell	Poland; Marian Sypniewski; Piotr Kiełpikowski; Adam Krzesiński; Cezary Siess; Ryszard Sobczak
1996 Atlanta	Russia; Dmitriy Shevchenko; Ilgar Mammadov; Vladislav Pavlovich	Poland; Piotr Kielpikowski; Adam Krzesinski; Ryszard Sobczak; Jarosław Rodzewicz	Cuba; Elvis Gregory; Rolando Leon; Oscar García Perez
2000 Sydney	France; Jean-Noël Ferrari; Brice Guyart; Patrice Lhotellier; Lionel Plumenail	China; Dong Zhaozhi; Wang Haibin; Ye Chong	Italy; Daniele Crosta; Gabriele Magni; Salvatore Sanzo; Matteo Zennaro
2004 Athens	Italy; Andrea Cassarà; Salvatore Sanzo; Simone Vanni	China; Dong Zhaozhi; Wang Haibin; Wu Hanxiong; Ye Chong	Russia; Renal Ganeev; Youri Moltchan; Rouslan Nassiboulline; Vyacheslav Pozdnyakov
2008 Beijing	not included in the Olympic program		
2012 London	Italy; Andrea Baldini; Giorgio Avola; Andrea Cassarà; Valerio Aspromonte	Japan; Ryo Miyake; Yuki Ota; Kenta Chida; Suguru Awaji	Germany; Peter Joppich; Sebastian Bachmann; Benjamin Kleibrink; André Weßels
2016 Rio de Janeiro	Russia; Timur Safin; Aleksey Cheremisinov; Artur Akhmatkhuzin	France; Enzo Lefort; Jérémy Cadot; Erwann Le Péchoux; Jean-Paul Tony Helissey	United States; Miles Chamley-Watson; Alexander Massialas; Gerek Meinhardt; Race Imboden
2020 Tokyo	France; Enzo Lefort; Erwann Le Péchoux; Julien Mertine; Maxime Pauty	ROC (ROC); Anton Borodachev; Kirill Borodachev; Vladislav Mylnikov; Timur Safin	United States; Race Imboden; Nick Itkin; Alexander Massialas; Gerek Meinhardt
2024 Paris	Japan; Kyosuke Matsuyama; Takahiro Shikine; Kazuki Iimura; Yudai Nagano	Italy; Guillaume Bianchi; Filippo Macchi; Tommaso Marini; Alessio Foconi	France; Maximilien Chastanet; Maxime Pauty; Enzo Lefort; Julien Mertine
2028 Los Angeles			

=== Épée, individual ===
Games	Gold	Silver	Bronze
1900 Paris	Ramón Fonst; Cuba	Louis Perrée; France	Léon Sée; France
1904 St. Louis	Ramón Fonst; Cuba	Charles Tatham; United States	Albertson Van Zo Post; United States
1908 London	Gaston Alibert; France	Alexandre Lippmann; France	Eugene Olivier; France
1912 Stockholm	Paul Anspach; Belgium	Ivan Joseph Martin Osiier; Denmark	Philippe le Hardy; Belgium
1920 Antwerp	Armand Massard; France	Alexandre Lippmann; France	Gustave Buchard; France
1924 Paris	Charles Delporte; Belgium	Roger Ducret; France	Nils Hellsten; Sweden
1928 Amsterdam	Lucien Gaudin; France	Georges Buchard; France	George Calnan; United States
1932 Los Angeles	Giancarlo Cornaggia-Medici; Italy	Georges Buchard; France	Carlo Agostoni; Italy
1936 Berlin	Franco Riccardi; Italy	Saverio Ragno; Italy	Giancarlo Cornaggia-Medici; Italy
1948 London	Luigi Cantone; Italy	Oswald Zappelli; Switzerland	Edoardo Mangiarotti; Italy
1952 Helsinki	Edoardo Mangiarotti; Italy	Dario Mangiarotti; Italy	Oswald Zappelli; Switzerland
1956 Melbourne	Carlo Pavesi; Italy	Giuseppe Delfino; Italy	Edoardo Mangiarotti; Italy
1960 Rome	Giuseppe Delfino; Italy	Allan Jay; Great Britain	Bruno Khabarov; Soviet Union
1964 Tokyo	Grigory Kriss; Soviet Union	Henry Hoskyns; Great Britain	Guram Kostava; Soviet Union
1968 Mexico City	Győző Kulcsár; Hungary	Grigory Kriss; Soviet Union	Gianluigi Saccaro; Italy
1972 Munich	Csaba Fenyvesi; Hungary	Jacques Ladegaillerie; France	Győző Kulcsár; Hungary
1976 Montreal	Alexander Pusch; West Germany	Hans-Jürgen Hehn; West Germany	Győző Kulcsár; Hungary
1980 Moscow	Johan Harmenberg; Sweden	Ernő Kolczonay; Hungary	Philippe Riboud; France
1984 Los Angeles	Philippe Boisse; France	Björne Väggö; Sweden	Philippe Riboud; France
1988 Seoul	Arnd Schmitt; West Germany	Philippe Riboud; France	Andrei Chouvalov; Soviet Union
1992 Barcelona	Éric Srecki; France	Pavel Kolobkov; Unified Team	Jean-Michel Henry; France
1996 Atlanta	Aleksandr Beketov; Russia	Ivan Trevejo; Cuba	Géza Imre; Hungary
2000 Sydney	Pavel Kolobkov; Russia	Hugues Obry; France	Lee Sang-ki; South Korea
2004 Athens	Marcel Fischer; Switzerland	Wang Lei; China	Pavel Kolobkov; Russia
2008 Beijing	Matteo Tagliariol; Italy	Fabrice Jeannet; France	José Luis Abajo; Spain
2012 London	Rubén Limardo; Venezuela	Bartosz Piasecki; Norway	Jung Jin-sun; South Korea
2016 Rio de Janeiro	Park Sang-young; South Korea	Géza Imre; Hungary	Gauthier Grumier; France
2020 Tokyo	Romain Cannone; France	Gergely Siklósi; Hungary	Igor Reizlin; Ukraine
2024 Paris	Koki Kano; Japan	Yannick Borel; France	Mohamed El-Sayed; Egypt
2028 Los Angeles			

=== Épée, team ===
Games	Gold	Silver	Bronze
1908 London	France; Gaston Alibert; Herman Georges Berger; Charles Collignon; Eugène Olivier; Bernard Gravier; Alexandre Lippmann; Jean Stern	Great Britain; Charles Leaf Daniell; Cecil Haig; Robert Montgomerie; Martin Holt; Edgar Amphlett	Belgium; Paul Anspach; Desire Beaurain; Ferdinand Feyerick; François Rom; Fernand de Montigny; Victor Willems; Fernand Bosmans
1912 Stockholm	Belgium; Paul Anspach; Henri Anspach; Robert Hennet; Fernand de Montigny; Jacques Ochs; François Rom; Gaston Salmon; Victor Willems	Great Britain; Edgar Seligman; Edgar Amphlett; Robert Montgomerie; Percival Dawson; Arthur Everitt; Sydney Mertineau; Martin Holt	Netherlands; Adrianus de Jong; Willem Hubert van Blijenburgh; Jetze Doorman; Leonardus Salomonson; George van Rossem
1920 Antwerp	Italy; Aldo Nadi; Nedo Nadi; Abelardo Olivier; Giovanni Canova; Dino Urbani; Tullio Bozza; Andrea Marrazzi; Antonio Allochio; Tommaso Costantino; Paolo Thaon di Revel	Belgium; Paul Anspach; Léon Tom; Ernest Gevers; Félix Goblet D'aviella; Victor Boin; Joseph De Craecker; Philippe Le Hardy de Beaulieu; Fernand de Montigny	France; Armand Massard; Alexandre Lippmann; Gustave Buchard; Georges Casanova; Georges Trombert; Gaston Amson; Louis Moreau
1924 Paris	France; Lucien Gaudin; Georges Buchard; Roger Ducret; André Labatut; Robert Liottel; Alexandre Lippmann; Georges Tainturier	Belgium; Paul Anspach; Joseph De Craecker; Charles Delporte; Fernand de Montigny; Ernest Gevers; Léon Tom	Italy; Giulio Basletta; Marcello Bertinetti; Giovanni Canova; Vincenzo Cuccia; V. Montegazza; Oreste Moricca
1928 Amsterdam	Italy; Giulio Basletta; Marcello Bertinetti; Giancarlo Cornaggia-Medici; Carlo Agostoni; Renzo Minoli; Franco Riccardi	France; Georges Buchard; Gaston Amson; Émile Cornic; Bernard Schmetz; René Barbier	Portugal; Paulo Leal; Mário de Noronha; Jorge de Paiva; Frederico Paredes; João Sassetti; Henrique da Silveira
1932 Los Angeles	France; Fernand Jourdant; Bernard Schmetz; Georges Tainturier; Georges Buchard; Jean Piot; Philippe Cattiau	Italy; Saverio Ragno; Giancarlo Cornaggia-Medici; Franco Riccardi; Carlo Agostoni; Renzo Minoli	United States; George Charles Calnan; Gustave Marinius Heiss; Frank Righeimer; Tracy Jaeckel; Curtis Charles Shears; Miguel Angel De Capriles
1936 Berlin	Italy; Alfredo Pezzana; Edoardo Mangiarotti; Saverio Ragno; Giancarlo Cornaggia-Medici; Giancarlo Brusati; Franco Riccardi	Sweden; Hans Drakenberg; Hans Granfelt; Gustaf Dyrssen; Gustav Almgren; Birger Cederin; Sven Thofelt	France; Henri Dulieux; Philippe Cattiau; Georges Buchard; Paul Wormser; Michel Pécheux; Bernard Schmetz
1948 London	France; Maurice Huet; Michel Pécheux; Marcel Desprets; Édouard Artigas; Henri Guerin; Henri Lepage	Italy; Luigi Cantone; Marc Antonio Mandruzzato; Carlo Agostoni; Edoardo Mangiarotti; Fiorenzo Marini; Dario Mangiarotti	Sweden; Frank Cervell; Carl Forssell; Bengt Ljungquist; Sven Thofelt; Per Hjalmar Carleson; Arne Tollbom
1952 Helsinki	Italy; Roberto Battaglia; Carlo Pavesi; Franco Bertinetti; Giuseppe Delfino; Dario Mangiarotti; Edoardo Mangiarotti	Sweden; Berndt-Otto Rehbinder; Bengt Ljungquist; Per Hjalmar Carleson; Carl Forssell; Sven Fahlman; Lennart Magnusson	Switzerland; Otto Rüfenacht; Paul Meister; Oswald Zappelli; Willy Fitting; Mario Valota; Paul Barth
1956 Melbourne	Italy; Giuseppe Delfino; Franco Bertinetti; Alberto Pellegrino; Giorgio Anglesio; Carlo Pavesi; Edoardo Mangiarotti	Hungary; Bela Rerrich; Ambrus Nagy; Barnabas Berzsenyi; Jozsef Marosi; Jozsef Sakovics; Lajos Balthazár	France; Yves Dreyfus; Rene Queyroux; Daniel Dagallier; Claude Nigon; Armand Mouyal
1960 Rome	Italy; Giuseppe Delfino; Alberto Pellegrino; Carlo Pavesi; Edoardo Mangiarotti; Fiorenzo Marini; Gianluigi Saccaro	Great Britain; Allan Jay; Michael Howard; John Pelling; Henry Hoskyns; Raymond Harrison; Michael Alexander	Soviet Union; Valentin Chernikov; Guram Kostava; Arnold Chernushevich; Bruno Khabarov; Aleksandr Pavlovsky
1964 Tokyo	Hungary; Árpád Bárány; Tamás Gábor; István Kausz; Győző Kulcsár; Zoltán Nemere	Italy; Giovan Battista Breda; Giuseppe Delfino; Gianfranco Paolucci; Alberto Pellegrino; Gianluigi Saccaro	France; Claude Bourquard; Claude Brodin; Jacques Brodin; Yves Dreyfus; Jack Guittet
1968 Mexico City	Hungary; Csaba Fenyvesi; Zoltán Nemere; Pál Schmitt; Győző Kulcsár; Pal Nagy	Soviet Union; Grigory Kriss; Iosif Vitebsky; Aleksei Nikanchikov; Yuri Smolyakov; Viktor Modzalevsky	Poland; Bogdan Andrzejewski; Michał Butkiewicz; Bogdan Gonsior; Henryk Nielaba; Kazimierz Barburski
1972 Munich	Hungary; Sándor Erdős; Csaba Fenyvesi; Győző Kulcsár; Pál Schmitt; István Osztrics	Switzerland; Guy Evequoz; Daniel Giger; Christian Kauter; Peter Lötscher; François Suchanecki	Soviet Union; Viktor Modzalevsky; Sergei Paramonov; Igor Valetov; Georgi Zažitski; Grigory Kriss
1976 Montreal	Sweden; Carl von Essen; Hans Jacobson; Rolf Edling; Leif Högström; Göran Flodström	West Germany; Alexander Pusch; Hans-Jürgen Hehn; Reinhold Behr; Volker Fischer; Hanns Jana	Switzerland; François Suchanecki; Michel Poffet; Daniel Giger; Christian Kauter; Jean-Blaise Evequoz
1980 Moscow	France; Philippe Riboud; Patrick Picot; Hubert Gardas; Philippe Boisse; Michel Salesse	Poland; Piotr Jabłkowski; Andrzej Lis; Leszek Swornowski; Ludomir Chronowski; Mariusz Strzałka	Soviet Union; Ashot Karagian; Boris Lukomsky; Aleksander Abushackmetov; Aleksander Mozhaev; Vladimir Smirnov
1984 Los Angeles	West Germany; Elmar Borrmann; Volker Fischer; Gerhard Heer; Rafael Nickel; Alexander Pusch	France; Philippe Boisse; Jean-Michel Henry; Olivier Lenglet; Philippe Riboud; Michel Salesse	Italy; Stefano Bellone; Sandro Cuomo; Cosimo Ferro; Roberto Manzi; Angelo Mazzoni
1988 Seoul	France; Frédéric Delpla; Jean-Michel Henry; Olivier Lenglet; Philippe Riboud; Éric Srecki	West Germany; Elmar Borrmann; Volker Fischer; Thomas Gerull; Alexander Pusch; Arnd Schmitt	Soviet Union; Andrey Shuvalov; Pavel Kolobkov; Wladimir Resnitschenko; Mikhail Tishko; Igor Tikhomirov
1992 Barcelona	Germany; Elmar Borrmann; Robert Felisiak; Arnd Schmitt; Uwe Proske; Wladimir Resnitschenko	Hungary; Iván Kovács; Krisztián Kulcsár; Ferenc Hegedűs; Ernő Kolczonay; Gábor Totola	Unified Team; Pavel Kolobkov; Andrey Shuvalov; Sergei Kravchuk; Sergei Kostarev; Valery Zakharevich
1996 Atlanta	Italy; Sandro Cuomo; Angelo Mazzoni; Maurizio Randazzo	Russia; Aleksandr Beketov; Pavel Kolobkov; Valery Zakharevich	France; Jean-Michel Henry; Robert Leroux; Éric Srecki
2000 Sydney	Italy; Angelo Mazzoni; Paolo Milanoli; Maurizio Randazzo; Alfredo Rota	France; Jean-François di Martino; Hugues Obry; Éric Srecki	Cuba; Nelson Loyola; Carlos Pedroso; Ivan Trevejo
2004 Athens	France; Fabrice Jeannet; Jérôme Jeannet; Hugues Obry; Érik Boisse	Hungary; Gábor Boczkó; Krisztián Kulcsár; Iván Kovács; Géza Imre	Germany; Sven Schmid; Jörg Fiedler; Daniel Strigel
2008 Beijing	France; Jérôme Jeannet; Fabrice Jeannet; Ulrich Robeiri	Poland; Robert Andrzejuk; Tomasz Motyka; Adam Wiercioch; Radosław Zawrotniak	Italy; Stefano Carozzo; Diego Confalonieri; Alfredo Rota; Matteo Tagliariol
2012 London	not included in the Olympic program		
2016 Rio de Janeiro	France; Gauthier Grumier; Yannick Borel; Daniel Jérent; Jean-Michel Lucenay	Italy; Enrico Garozzo; Marco Fichera; Paolo Pizzo; Andrea Santarelli	Hungary; Géza Imre; Gábor Boczkó; András Rédli; Péter Somfai
2020 Tokyo	Japan; Koki Kano; Kazuyasu Minobe; Masaru Yamada; Satoru Uyama	ROC (ROC); Sergey Bida; Sergey Khodos; Pavel Sukhov; Nikita Glazkov	South Korea; Park Sang-young; Ma Se-geon; Song Jae-ho; Kweon Young-jun
2024 Paris	Hungary; Máté Tamás Koch; Tibor Andrásfi; Gergely Siklósi; Dávid Nagy	Japan; Akira Komata; Koki Kano; Masaru Yamada; Kazuyasu Minobe	Czech Republic; Jiří Beran; Jakub Jurka; Martin Rubeš; Michal Čupr
2028 Los Angeles			

=== Sabre, individual ===
Games	Gold	Silver	Bronze
1896 Athens	Ioannis Georgiadis; Greece	Telemachos Karakalos; Greece	Holger Nielsen; Denmark
1900 Paris	Georges de la Falaise; France	Léon Thiébaut; France	Siegfried Flesch; Austria
1904 St. Louis	Manuel Díaz; Cuba	William Grebe; United States	Albertson Van Zo Post; United States
1908 London	Jenő Fuchs; Hungary	Béla Zulawsky; Hungary	Vilém Goppold von Lobsdorf; Bohemia
1912 Stockholm	Jenő Fuchs; Hungary	Béla Békéssy; Hungary	Ervin Mészáros; Hungary
1920 Antwerp	Nedo Nadi; Italy	Aldo Nadi; Italy	Adrianus de Jong; Netherlands
1924 Paris	Sándor Pósta; Hungary	Roger Ducret; France	János Garay; Hungary
1928 Amsterdam	Ödön Tersztyánszky; Hungary	Attila Petschauer; Hungary	Bino Bini; Italy
1932 Los Angeles	György Piller; Hungary	Giulio Gaudini; Italy	Endre Kabos; Hungary
1936 Berlin	Endre Kabos; Hungary	Gustavo Marzi; Italy	Aladár Gerevich; Hungary
1948 London	Aladár Gerevich; Hungary	Vincenzo Pinton; Italy	Pál Kovács; Hungary
1952 Helsinki	Pál Kovács; Hungary	Aladár Gerevich; Hungary	Tibor Berczelly; Hungary
1956 Melbourne	Rudolf Kárpáti; Hungary	Jerzy Pawłowski; Poland	Lev Kuznetsov; Soviet Union
1960 Rome	Rudolf Kárpáti; Hungary	Zoltán Horváth; Hungary	Wladimiro Calarese; Italy
1964 Tokyo	Tibor Pézsa; Hungary	Claude Arabo; France	Umar Mavlikhanov; Soviet Union
1968 Mexico City	Jerzy Pawłowski; Poland	Mark Rakita; Soviet Union	Tibor Pézsa; Hungary
1972 Munich	Viktor Sidyak; Soviet Union	Péter Maróth; Hungary	Vladimir Nazlymov; Soviet Union
1976 Montreal	Viktor Krovopuskov; Soviet Union	Vladimir Nazlymov; Soviet Union	Viktor Sidyak; Soviet Union
1980 Moscow	Viktor Krovopuskov; Soviet Union	Mikhail Burtsev; Soviet Union	Imre Gedővári; Hungary
1984 Los Angeles	Jean-François Lamour; France	Marco Marin; Italy	Peter Westbrook; United States
1988 Seoul	Jean-François Lamour; France	Janusz Olech; Poland	Giovanni Scalzo; Italy
1992 Barcelona	Bence Szabó; Hungary	Marco Marin; Italy	Jean-François Lamour; France
1996 Atlanta	Stanislav Pozdnyakov; Russia	Sergey Sharikov; Russia	Damien Touya; France
2000 Sydney	Mihai Covaliu; Romania	Mathieu Gourdain; France	Wiradech Kothny; Germany
2004 Athens	Aldo Montano; Italy	Zsolt Nemcsik; Hungary	Vladyslav Tretiak; Ukraine
2008 Beijing	Zhong Man; China	Nicolas Lopez; France	Mihai Covaliu; Romania
2012 London	Áron Szilágyi; Hungary	Diego Occhiuzzi; Italy	Nikolay Kovalev; Russia
2016 Rio de Janeiro	Áron Szilágyi; Hungary	Daryl Homer; United States	Kim Jung-hwan; South Korea
2020 Tokyo	Áron Szilágyi; Hungary	Luigi Samele; Italy	Kim Jung-hwan; South Korea
2024 Paris	Oh Sang-uk; South Korea	Farès Ferjani; Tunisia	Luigi Samele; Italy
2028 Los Angeles			

=== Sabre, team ===
Games	Gold	Silver	Bronze
1908 London	Hungary; Jenő Fuchs; Oszkár Gerde; Péter Tóth; Lajos Werkner; Dezső Földes	Italy; Marcello Bertinetti; Riccardo Nowak; Abelardo Olivier; Alessandro Pirzio-Biroli; Sante Ceccherini	Bohemia; Vlastimil Lada-Sázavský; Vilém Goppold von Lobsdorf; Bedřich Schejbal; Jaroslav Šourek-Tuček; Otakar Lada
1912 Stockholm	Hungary; Jenő Fuchs; László Berti; Ervin Mészáros; Dezső Földes; Oszkár Gerde; Zoltán Ozoray Schenker; Péter Tóth; Lajos Werkner	Austria; Richard Verderber; Otto Herschmann; Rudolf Cvetko; Friedrich Golling; Andreas Suttner; Albert Bogen; Reinhold Trampler	Netherlands; Willem Hubert van Blijenburgh; George van Rossem; Adrianus de Jong; Jetze Doorman; Dirk Scalongne; Hendrik de Iongh
1920 Antwerp	Italy; Aldo Nadi; Nedo Nadi; Francesco Gargano; Oreste Puliti; Giorgio Santelli; Dino Urbani; Federico Secondo Cesarano; Baldo Baldi	France; Jean Margraff; Marc Marie Jean Perrodon; Henri de Saint Germain; Georges Trombert; Lucien Gaudin	Netherlands; Jan Van Der Wiel; Adrianus de Jong; Jetze Doorman; Willem Hubert van Blijenburgh; Louis Delaunoy; Salomon Zeldenrust
1924 Paris	Italy; Renato Anselmi; Guido Balzarini; Marcello Bertinetti; Bino Bini; Vincenzo Cuccia; Oreste Moricca; Oreste Puliti; Giulio Sarrocchi	Hungary; László Berti; János Garay; Sándor Pósta; József Rády; Zoltán Ozoray Schenker; László Széchy; Ödön Tersztyánszky; Jenő Uhlyárik	Netherlands; Adrianus de Jong; Jetze Doorman; Hendrik Scherpenhuyzen; Jan Van Der Wiel; Maarten Hendrik Van Dulm; Henri Jacob Wynoldy-Daniels
1928 Amsterdam	Hungary; Ödön Tersztyánszky; János Garay; Attila Petschauer; József Rády; Sándor Gombos; Gyula Glykais	Italy; Bino Bini; Oreste Puliti; Giulio Sarrocchi; Renato Anselmi; Emilio Salafia; Gustavo Marzi	Poland; Adam Papée; Tadeusz Friedrich; Kazimierz Laskowski; Władysław Segda; Aleksander Małecki; Jerzy Zabielski
1932 Los Angeles	Hungary; Endre Kabos; Attila Petschauer; Ernő Nagy; Gyula Glykais; György Piller; Aladár Gerevich	Italy; Gustavo Marzi; Giulio Gaudini; Renato Anselmi; Emilio Salafia; Arturo De Vecchi; Ugo Pignotti	Poland; Tadeusz Friedrich; Marian Suski; Władysław Dobrowolski; Władysław Segda; Leszek Lubicz; Adam Papée
1936 Berlin	Hungary; Pál Kovács; Tibor Berczelly; Imre Rajczy; Aladár Gerevich; Endre Kabos; László Rajcsányi	Italy; Vincenzo Pinton; Aldo Masciotta; Athos Tanzini; Aldo Montano; Gustavo Marzi; Giulio Gaudini	Germany; Hans Jörger; Julius Eisenecker; August Heim; Erwin Casmir; Richard Wahl; Hans Esser
1948 London	Hungary; László Rajcsányi; Bertalan Papp; Aladár Gerevich; Tibor Berczelly; Rudolf Kárpáti; Pál Kovács	Italy; Carlo Turcato; Gastone Darè; Vincenzo Pinton; Mauro Racca; Renzo Nostini; Aldo Montano	United States; Miguel Angel De Capriles; Norman Cohn-Armitage; George Vitez Worth; Dean Victor Cetrulo; James Hummitzsch Flynn; Tibor Andrew Nyilas
1952 Helsinki	Hungary; Bertalan Papp; László Rajcsányi; Rudolf Kárpáti; Tibor Berczelly; Aladár Gerevich; Pál Kovács	Italy; Giorgio Pellini; Vincenzo Pinton; Renzo Nostini; Mauro Racca; Gastone Darè; Roberto Ferrari	France; Maurice Piot; Jacques Lefèvre; Bernard Morel; Jean Laroyenne; Jean-Francois Tournon; Jean Levavasseur
1956 Melbourne	Hungary; Attila Keresztes; Aladár Gerevich; Rudolf Kárpáti; Jenő Hámori; Pál Kovács; Dániel Magay	Poland; Zygmunt Pawlas; Jerzy Pawłowski; Wojciech Zabłocki; Andrzej Ryszard Piątkowski; Marian Kuszewski; Ryszard Zub	Soviet Union; Yakov Rylsky; David Tyshler; Lev Kuznetsov; Yevgeny Cherepovsky; Leonid Bogdanov
1960 Rome	Hungary; Tamás Mendelényi; Rudolf Kárpáti; Pál Kovács; Zoltán Horváth; Gábor Delneky; Aladár Gerevich	Poland; Andrzej Piatkowski; Emil Ochyra; Wojciech Zabłocki; Jerzy Pawłowski; Ryszard Zub; Marian Kuszewski	Italy; Wladimiro Calarese; Giampaolo Calanchini; Pierluigi Chicca; Roberto Ferrari; Mario Ravagnan
1964 Tokyo	Soviet Union; Boris Melnikov; Nugzar Asatiani; Mark Rakita; Yakov Rylsky; Umyar Mavlikhanov	Italy; Giampaolo Calanchini; Wladimiro Calarese; Pierluigi Chicca; Mario Ravagnan; Cesare Salvadori	Poland; Emil Ochyra; Jerzy Pawłowski; Ryszard Zub; Andrzej Piatkowski; Wojciech Zabłocki
1968 Mexico City	Soviet Union; Vladimir Nazlymov; Viktor Sidyak; Eduard Vinokurov; Mark Rakita; Umyar Mavlikhanov	Italy; Wladimiro Calarese; Michele Maffei; Cesare Salvadori; Pierluigi Chicca; Rolando Rigoli	Hungary; Tamás Kovács; János Kalmár; Péter Bakonyi; Miklós Meszéna; Tibor Pézsa
1972 Munich	Italy; Michele Maffei; Mario Aldo Montano; Mario Tullio Montano; Rolando Rigoli; Cesare Salvadori	Soviet Union; Viktor Bashenov; Vladimir Nazlymov; Viktor Sidyak; Eduard Vinokurov; Mark Rakita	Hungary; Pál Gerevich; Tamás Kovács; Péter Marót; Tibor Pézsa; Péter Bakonyi
1976 Montreal	Soviet Union; Viktor Krovopuskov; Eduard Vinokurov; Viktor Sidyak; Vladimir Nazlymov; Mikhail Burtsev	Italy; Mario Aldo Montano; Michele Maffei; Angelo Arcidiacono; Tommaso Montano; Mario Tullio Montano	Romania; Daniel Irimiciuc; Ioan Pop; Marin Mustata; Corneliu Marin; Alexandru Nilca
1980 Moscow	Soviet Union; Mikhail Burtsev; Viktor Krovopuskov; Viktor Sidyak; Vladimir Nazlymov	Italy; Michele Maffei; Mario Aldo Montano; Marco Romano; Ferdinando Meglio	Hungary; Imre Gedővári; Rudolf Nébald; Pál Gerevich; Ferenc Hammang; György Nébald
1984 Los Angeles	Italy; Marco Marin; Gianfranco Dalla Barba; Giovanni Scalzo; Ferdinando Meglio; Angelo Arcidiacono	France; Jean-François Lamour; Pierre Guichot; Hervé Granger-Veyron; Philippe Delrieu; Franck Ducheix	Romania; Marin Mustata; Ioan Pop; Alexandru Chiculita; Corneliu Marin; Vilmos Szabo
1988 Seoul	Hungary; Imre Bujdosó; László Csongrádi; Imre Gedővári; György Nébald; Bence Szabó	Soviet Union; Andrei Alshan; Mikhail Burtsev; Sergei Koryakin; Sergei Mindirgassov; Heorhiy Pohosov	Italy; Massimo Cavaliere; Gianfranco Dalla Barba; Marco Marin; Ferdinando Meglio; Giovanni Scalzo
1992 Barcelona	Unified Team; Grigory Kiriyenko; Aleksandr Shirshov; Heorhiy Pohosov; Vadim Gutzeit; Stanislav Pozdnyakov	Hungary; Bence Szabó; Csaba Köves; György Nébald; Péter Abay; Imre Bujdosó	France; Jean-François Lamour; Jean-Phillippe Daurelle; Franck Ducheix; Hervé Grainger-Veyron; Pierre Guichot
1996 Atlanta	Russia; Stanislav Pozdnyakov; Grigory Kiriyenko; Sergey Sharikov	Hungary; Csaba Köves; József Navarrete; Bence Szabó	Italy; Raffaello Caserta; Luigi Tarantino; Toni Terenzi
2000 Sydney	Russia; Sergey Sharikov; Aleksey Frosin; Stanislav Pozdnyakov	France; Mathieu Gourdain; Julien Pillet; Cédric Séguin; Damien Touya	Germany; Dennis Bauer; Wiradech Kothny; Alexander Weber
2004 Athens	France; Julien Pillet; Damien Touya; Gaël Touya	Italy; Aldo Montano; Gianpiero Pastore; Luigi Tarantino	Russia; Sergey Sharikov; Aleksey Dyachenko; Stanislav Pozdnyakov; Aleksey Yakimenko
2008 Beijing	France; Nicolas Lopez; Julien Pillet; Boris Sanson	United States; Tim Morehouse; Jason Rogers; Keeth Smart; James Williams	Italy; Aldo Montano; Diego Occhiuzzi; Giampiero Pastore; Luigi Tarantino
2012 London	South Korea; Gu Bon-gil; Won Woo-young; Kim Jung-hwan; Oh Eun-seok	Romania; Rareș Dumitrescu; Tiberiu Dolniceanu; Florin Zalomir; Alexandru Siriţeanu	Italy; Aldo Montano; Diego Occhiuzzi; Luigi Samele; Luigi Tarantino
2016 Rio de Janeiro	not included in the Olympic program		
2020 Tokyo	South Korea; Kim Jung-hwan; Oh Sang-uk; Gu Bon-gil; Kim Jun-ho	Italy; Aldo Montano; Luca Curatoli; Enrico Berrè; Luigi Samele	Hungary; Áron Szilágyi; Tamás Decsi; András Szatmári; Csanád Gémesi
2024 Paris	South Korea; Oh Sang-uk; Gu Bon-gil; Park Sang-won; Do Gyeong-dong	Hungary; Áron Szilágyi; Csanád Gémesi; András Szatmári; Krisztián Rabb	France; Sébastien Patrice; Maxime Pianfetti; Boladé Apithy; Jean-Philippe Patrice
2028 Los Angeles			

== Discontinued events ==
=== Épée, Amateurs and Masters ===
Games	Gold	Silver	Bronze
1900 Paris	Albert Robert Ayat; France	Ramón Fonst; Cuba	Léon Sée; France

=== Épée, Masters ===
Games	Gold	Silver	Bronze
1900 Paris	Albert Robert Ayat; France	Émile Bougnol; France	Henri Laurent; France

=== Foil, Masters ===
Games	Gold	Silver	Bronze
1896 Athens	Leonidas Pyrgos; Greece	Joanni Perronet; France	none awarded
1900 Paris	Lucien Mérignac; France	Alphonse Kirchhoffer; France	Jean-Baptiste Mimiague; France

=== Sabre, Masters ===
Games	Gold	Silver	Bronze
1900 Paris	Antonio Conte; Italy	Italo Santelli; Italy	Milan Neralić; Austria

=== Singlestick ===
Games	Gold	Silver	Bronze
1904 St. Louis	Albertson Van Zo Post; United States	William O'Connor; United States	William Grebe; United States

== All-time medal table – Men's – 1896–2024 ==
Rank	Team	Gold	Silver	Bronze	Total
1	France	40	39	32	111
2	Italy	38	40	26	104
3	Hungary	31	19	21	71
4	Soviet Union	13	12	14	39
5	Russia	7	2	6	15
6	South Korea	6	0	6	12
7	Poland	4	8	7	19
8	West Germany	4	6	0	10
9	Cuba	4	3	3	10
10	Belgium	3	3	4	10
11	Japan	3	3	0	6
12	Germany	3	2	6	11
13	Sweden	2	3	2	7
14	China	2	3	0	5
15	Romania	2	1	3	6
16	Greece	2	1	2	5
17	Hong Kong	2	0	0	2
18	United States	1	9	14	24
19	Switzerland	1	2	3	6
20	Unified Team	1	2	1	4
21	Mixed team	1	0	0	1
21	Venezuela	1	0	0	1
23	Great Britain	0	5	0	5
24	ROC (ROC)	0	2	0	2
25	Austria	0	1	3	4
26	Denmark	0	1	1	2
26	Egypt	0	1	1	2
28	East Germany	0	1	0	1
28	Norway	0	1	0	1
28	Tunisia	0	1	0	1
31	Netherlands	0	0	5	5
32	Bohemia	0	0	2	2
32	Czech Republic	0	0	2	2
32	Ukraine	0	0	2	2
35	Argentina	0	0	1	1
35	Portugal	0	0	1	1
35	Spain	0	0	1	1
35	United Team of Germany	0	0	1	1
Totals (38 entries)		171	171	170	512

== See also ==
- Fencing at the 1906 Intercalated Games are no longer regarded as official Games by the International Olympic Committee
