= Fencing at the 1920 Summer Olympics – Men's team épée =

Men's team épée at the Games of the VII Olympiad
- Venue: Gardens de la Palace d'Egmont
- Date: August 20, 1920
- Competitors: ? from 11 nations

Medalists
1st place, gold medalist(s)		Italy: Olivier Abelardo; Antonio Allochio; Tullio Bozza; Giovanni Canova; Tommaso Constantino; Andrea Marrazzi; Aldo Nadi; Nedo Nadi; Dino Urbani; Paolo Thaon
2nd place, silver medalist(s)		Belgium: Paul Anspach; Victor Boin; Joseph de Craecker; Ernest Gevers; Félix Goblet; Philippe le Hardy; Léon Tom
3rd place, bronze medalist(s)		France: Gaston Amson; Gustave Buchard; Georges Casanova; Alexandre Lippmann; Armand Massard; Louis Moureau; Georges Trombert

The men's team épée was a fencing event held as part of the Fencing at the 1920 Summer Olympics programme. It was the third appearance of the event. Eleven nations competed.

== Rosters ==
Belgium

- Ernest Gevers
- Paul Anspach
- Félix, Count Goblet d'Alviella
- Victor Boin
- Joseph De Craecker
- Léon Tom
- Philippe Le Hardy de Beaulieu

Czechoslovakia

- Jan Černohorský
- Otakar Švorčík
- Zdeněk Vávra
- Josef Jungmann
- Josef Javůrek

Denmark

- Otto Bærentzen
- Ejnar Levison
- Ivan Osiier
- Poul Rasmussen
- Aage Berntsen
- Georg Hegner

France

- Alexandre Lippmann
- Gustave Buchard
- Georges Trombert
- Georges Casanova
- Louis Moureau
- Gaston Amson
- Armand Massard

Great Britain

- J. P. Blake
- George Burt
- Martin Holt
- Robert Montgomerie
- Charles Notley
- Edgar Seligman

Italy

- Nedo Nadi
- Aldo Nadi
- Abelardo Olivier
- Dino Urbani
- Tommaso Costantino
- Tullio Bozza
- Giovanni Canova
- Andrea Marrazzi
- Antonio Allocchio

Netherlands

- Arie de Jong
- Willem Hubert van Blijenburgh
- George van Rossem
- Salomon Zeldenrust
- Henri Wijnoldy-Daniëls
- Jetze Doorman

Portugal

- António de Menezes
- Jorge de Paiva
- Rui Mayer
- João Sassetti
- Henrique da Silveira
- Frederico Paredes
- Manuel Queiróz

Sweden

- Nils Hellsten
- Gustaf Lindblom
- Bertil Uggla
- David Warholm

Switzerlands

- Henri Jacquet
- Léopold Montagnier
- Franz Wilhelm
- Frédéric Fitting
- Eugène Empeyta
- Louis de Tribolet
- John Albaret
- Édouard Fitting

United States

- William Russell
- Ray Dutcher
- Henry Breckinridge
- Arthur Lyon
- Robert Sears
- Harold Rayner

== Results ==
=== Semifinals ===
Pool A
Place	Team	Wins	Losses	Qual.
1	France	4	0	Q
2	Switzerland	3	1	Q
3	United States	2	3	Q
4	Great Britain	1	4	
5	Czechoslovakia	0	5	
Pool B
Place	Team	Wins	Losses	Qual.
1	Belgium	4	1	Q
2	Portugal	3	1	Q
2	Italy	3	1	Q
4	Netherlands	2	2	
5	Denmark	1	4	
6	Sweden	0	4	

=== Final ===
Final
Place	Team	Wins	Losses
Gold	Italy	5	0
Silver	Belgium	4	1
Bronze	France	2	2
4	Portugal	2	2
5	Switzerland	1	4
6	United States	0	5

== Sources ==
- Belgium Olympic Committee (1957). Olympic Games Antwerp 1920: Official Report (in French).
- Wudarski, Pawel (1999). "Wyniki Igrzysk Olimpijskich" (in Polish). Archived from the original on 16 February 2009.
