= Fencing at the 1920 Summer Olympics – Men's foil =

Men's foil at the Games of the VII Olympiad
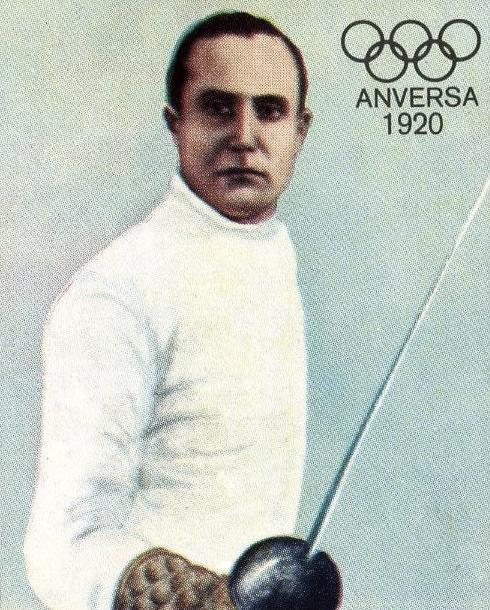
- Nedo Nadi
- Venue: Gardens de la Palace d'Egmont
- Dates: August 17–18, 1920
- Competitors: 56 from 10 nations

Medalists
1st place, gold medalist(s)		Nedo Nadi	Italy
2nd place, silver medalist(s)		Philippe Cattiau	France
3rd place, bronze medalist(s)		Roger Ducret	France

The men's foil was a fencing event held as part of the Fencing at the 1920 Summer Olympics programme in Antwerp, Belgium. It was the fifth appearance of the event. A total of 56 fencers from 10 nations competed in the event, which was held on August 17 and August 18, 1920. Nations were limited to eight fencers each, with Belgium and Italy entering the maximum. Nedo Nadi of Italy repeated as Olympic champion, retaining the title he initially won at the 1912 Summer Olympics. Philippe Cattiau and Roger Ducret of France earned silver and bronze, respectively, returning France to the podium for the first time since 1900.

== Background ==
This was the fifth appearance of the event, which has been held at every Summer Olympics except 1908 (when there was a foil display only rather than a medal event). Four of the 1912 finalists returned after the war: gold medalist Nedo Nadi and silver medalist Pietro Speciale of Italy and sixth-place finisher Edgar Seligman and eighth-place finisher Robert Montgomerie of Great Britain.

Czechoslovakia and Egypt each made their debut in the men's foil. The United States made its fourth appearance, having missed only the inaugural 1896 competition. France, a perennial power in the event, returned after not traveling to St. Louis in 1904 and boycotting the 1912 fencing competitions over rules disputes.

== Competition format ==
The event used a three-round format. In each round, the fencers were divided into pools to play a round-robin within the pool. Bouts were to three touches (an unpopular change from the more typical five). Standard foil rules were used, including that touches had to be made with the tip of the foil, the target area was limited to the torso, and priority determined the winner of double touches.

- Quarterfinals: There were 8 pools of between 5 and 9 fencers each. The top 3 fencers in each quarterfinal advanced to the semifinals.
- Semifinals: There were 4 pools of 6 fencers each. The top 3 fencers in each semifinal advanced to the final.
- Final: The final pool had 12 fencers.

== Schedule ==
Date	Time	Round
Tuesday, 17 August 1920	9:00	Quarterfinals
Wednesday, 18 August 1920	15:30	Semifinals; Final

== Results ==
=== Quarterfinals ===
==== Quarterfinal A ====
Rank	Fencer	Nation	Wins	Losses	Notes
1	André Labatut	France	6	0	Q
2	Jean Verbrugge	Belgium	5	1	Q
3	Ejnar Levison	Denmark	4	2	Q
4	Henry Breckinridge	United States	2	4	
4	Wouter Brouwer	Netherlands	2	4	
4	Rodolfo Terlizzi	Italy	2	4	
7	Cecil Kershaw	Great Britain	0	6	

==== Quarterfinal B ====
Rank	Fencer	Nation	Wins	Losses	Notes
1	Nedo Nadi	Italy	7	1	Q
2	Georges Trombert	France	7	1	Q
3	Viliam Tvrzský	Czechoslovakia	6	2	Q
4	Salomon Zeldenrust	Netherlands	5	3	
5	Millard Bloomer	United States	4	4	
6	Albert Pape	Belgium	3	5	
7	H. Evan James	Great Britain	2	6	
7	Gustaf Lindblom	Sweden	2	6	
9	Kay Schrøder	Denmark	0	8	

==== Quarterfinal C ====
Rank	Fencer	Nation	Wins	Losses	Notes
1	Aldo Nadi	Italy	6	0	Q
2	Ivan Osiier	Denmark	4	2	Q
3	Lionel Bony de Castellane	France	4	2	Q
4	Eugène Dufrane	Belgium	3	3	
4	Roland Willoughby	Great Britain	3	3	
6	Josef Jungmann	Czechoslovakia	1	5	
7	Nils Hellsten	Sweden	0	6	

==== Quarterfinal D ====
Rank	Fencer	Nation	Wins	Losses	Notes
1	Abelardo Olivier	Italy	7	1	Q
2	Modeste Cuypers	Belgium	6	2	Q
2	Marcel Perrot	France	6	2	Q
4	Georg Hegner	Denmark	4	4	
4	Adrianus de Jong	Netherlands	4	4	
6	Josef Javůrek	Czechoslovakia	3	5	
6	Brooks Parker	United States	3	5	
8	Robert Montgomerie	Great Britain	2	6	
9	Hans Törnblom	Sweden	1	7	

==== Quarterfinal E ====
Rank	Fencer	Nation	Wins	Losses	Notes
1	Federico Cesarano	Italy	4	0	Q
2	Charles Crahay	Belgium	3	1	Q
3	Francis Honeycutt	United States	2	2	Q
4	Ahmed Hassanein	Egypt	1	3	
5	Verner Bonde	Denmark	0	4	

==== Quarterfinal F ====
Rank	Fencer	Nation	Wins	Losses	Notes
1	Philippe Cattiau	France	6	0	Q
2	Pietro Speciale	Italy	4	2	Q
3	Knut Enell	Sweden	4	2	Q
4	Marcel Berré	Belgium	2	4	
4	Geoffrey Doyne	Great Britain	2	4	
4	František Dvořák	Czechoslovakia	2	4	
7	Jan Van der Wiel	Netherlands	1	6	

==== Quarterfinal G ====
Rank	Fencer	Nation	Wins	Losses	Notes
1	Roger Ducret	France	5	0	Q
2	Oreste Puliti	Italy	4	1	Q
3	Robert de Schepper	Belgium	3	2	Q
4	Thomas Wand-Tetley	Great Britain	2	3	
5	George Calnan	United States	1	4	
6	Aage Berntsen	Denmark	0	5	

==== Quarterfinal H ====
Rank	Fencer	Nation	Wins	Losses	Notes
1	Fernand de Montigny	Belgium	5	0	Q
2	Tommaso Constantino	Italy	4	1	Q
3	Félix Vigeveno	Netherlands	3	2	Q
4	Edgar Seligman	Great Britain	2	3	
5	Antonín Mikala	Czechoslovakia	1	4	
6	Leonard Schoonmaker	United States	0	5	

=== Semifinals ===
==== Semifinal A ====
Rank	Fencer	Nation	Wins	Losses	Notes
1	Nedo Nadi	Italy	5	0	Q
2	Oreste Puliti	Italy	4	1	Q
3	Roger Ducret	France	3	2	Q
4	Lionel Bony de Castellane	France	2	3	
5	Robert de Schepper	Belgium	1	4	
6	Francis Honeycutt	United States	0	5	

==== Semifinal B ====
Rank	Fencer	Nation	Wins	Losses	Notes
1	Philippe Cattiau	France	4	1	Q
1	Aldo Nadi	Italy	4	1	Q
3	Marcel Perrot	France	3	2	Q
4	Modeste Cuypers	Belgium	2	3	
5	Ejnar Levison	Denmark	1	4	
5	Viliam Tvrský	Czechoslovakia	1	4	

==== Semifinal C ====
Rank	Fencer	Nation	Wins	Losses	Notes
1	Fernand de Montigny	Belgium	4	1	Q
1	Georges Trombert	France	4	1	Q
3	Ivan Osiier	Denmark	3	2	Q
4	Tommaso Constantino	Italy	2	3	
4	Charles Crahay	Belgium	2	3	
6	Federico Cesarano	Italy	0	5	

==== Semifinal D ====
Rank	Fencer	Nation	Wins	Losses	Notes
1	André Labatut	France	5	0	Q
2	Abelardo Olivier	Italy	4	1	Q
3	Pietro Speciale	Italy	2	3	Q
4	Félix Vigeveno	Netherlands	2	3	
5	Knut Enell	Sweden	1	4	
5	Jean Verbrugge	Belgium	1	4	

=== Final ===
Rank	Fencer	Nation	Wins	Losses	TA
1st place, gold medalist(s)	Nedo Nadi	Italy	10	1	
2nd place, silver medalist(s)	Philippe Cattiau	France	9	2	14
3rd place, bronze medalist(s)	Roger Ducret	France	9	2	19
4	André Labatut	France	7	4	
5	Aldo Nadi	Italy	6	5	19
6	Fernand de Montigny	Belgium	6	5	27
7	Oreste Puliti	Italy	5	6	
8	Ivan Osiier	Denmark	4	7	
9	Abelardo Olivier	Italy	3	8	
10	Georges Trombert	France	3	8	
11	Marcel Perrot	France	3	8	
12	Pietro Speciale	Italy	1	10	
