= Fencing at the 1920 Summer Olympics =

Fencing at the Games of the VII Olympiad

Fencing events were held at the 1920 Summer Olympics in Antwerp, Belgium. There were six fencing events that were contested. All events featured only male competitors.

== Medal summary ==
| Event | Gold | Silver | Bronze |
|---|---|---|---|
| Épée, Individual | Armand Massard; France | Alexandre Lippmann; France | Gustave Buchard; France |
| Épée, Team | Italy; Aldo Nadi; Nedo Nadi; Abelardo Olivier; Giovanni Canova; Dino Urbani; Tullio Bozza; Andrea Marrazzi; Antonio Allochio; Tommaso Constantino; Paolo Thaon di Revel | Belgium; Paul Anspach; Léon Tom; Ernest Gevers; Félix Goblet D'aviella; Victor Boin; Joseph De Craecker; Philippe Le Hardy De Beaulieu; Fernand de Montigny | France; Armand Massard; Alexandre Lippmann; Gustave Buchard; Georges Casanova; Georges Trombert; Gaston Amson; Louis Moureau |
| Foil, Individual | Nedo Nadi; Italy | Philippe Cattiau; France | Roger Ducret; France |
| Foil, Team | Italy; Aldo Nadi; Nedo Nadi; Abelardo Olivier; Pietro Speciale; Rodolfo Terlizzi; Oreste Puliti; Tommaso Constantino; Baldo Baldi | France; André Labattut; Georges Trombert; Marcel Perrot; Lucien Gaudin; Philippe Cattiau; Roger Ducret; Gaston Amson; Lionel Bony De Castellane | United States; Francis Honeycutt; Arthur Lyon; Robert Sears; Henry Breckinridge; Harold Rayner |
| Sabre, Individual | Nedo Nadi; Italy | Aldo Nadi; Italy | Adrianus De Jong; Netherlands |
| Sabre, Team | Italy; Aldo Nadi; Nedo Nadi; Francesco Gargano; Oreste Puliti; Giorgio Santelli; Dino Urbani; Federico Cesarano; Baldo Baldi | France; Jean Margraff; Marc Marie Jean Perrodon; Henri Marie Raoul De Saint Germain; Georges Trombert | Netherlands; Jan Van Der Wiel; Adrianus De Jong; Jetze Doorman; Willem Van Blijenburgh; Louis Delaunoy; Salomon Zeldenrust |

== Participating nations ==
A total of 149 fencers from 13 nations competed at the Antwerp Games:

- Belgium (22)
- Czechoslovakia (9)
- Denmark (8)
- Egypt (1)
- France (18)
- Great Britain (18)
- Greece (3)
- Italy (19)
- Netherlands (10)
- Portugal (8)
- Sweden (8)
- Switzerland (8)
- United States (17)

== Medal table ==
| Rank | Nation | Gold | Silver | Bronze | Total |
|---|---|---|---|---|---|
| 1 | Italy | 5 | 1 | 0 | 6 |
| 2 | France | 1 | 4 | 3 | 8 |
| 3 | Belgium | 0 | 1 | 0 | 1 |
| 4 | Netherlands | 0 | 0 | 2 | 2 |
| 5 | United States | 0 | 0 | 1 | 1 |
| Totals (5 entries) | | 6 | 6 | 6 | 18 |

== Notes ==
- Belgium Olympic Committee (1957). Olympic Games Antwerp 1920: Official Report (in French).
- Wudarski, Pawel (1999). "Wyniki Igrzysk Olimpijskich" (in Polish). Archived from the original on 16 February 2009.
