= Portugal at the 1920 Summer Olympics =

- IOC code: POR
- NOC: Olympic Committee of Portugal

in Antwerp
- Competitors: 13 in 2 sports
- Medals: Gold 0 Silver 0 Bronze 0 Total 0

Summer Olympics appearances (overview)
- 1912; 1920; 1924; 1928; 1932; 1936; 1948; 1952; 1956; 1960; 1964; 1968; 1972; 1976; 1980; 1984; 1988; 1992; 1996; 2000; 2004; 2008; 2012; 2016; 2020; 2024

Portugal competed at the 1920 Summer Olympics in Antwerp, Belgium. It was the nation's second appearance at the Summer Olympics. A delegation of thirteen competitors participated in two sports, however no medals were won.

== Fencing ==
Fencer	Event	First round		Quarterfinals		Semifinals		Final	
Fencer	Event	Result	Rank	Result	Rank	Result	Rank	Result	Rank
António de Menezes	Épée	4–3	2	7–4	2	7–4	2	5–6	6
Fernando Correia	Épée	5–2	1	6–4	2	2–9	10	did not advance	
Frederico Paredes	Épée	4–5	6	did not advance					
Henrique da Silveira	Épée	5–3	4	4–6	7	did not advance			
João Sassetti	Épée	6–3	2	8–3	1	2–9	12	did not advance	
Jorge de Paiva	Épée	5–3	4	7–3	2	6–5	2	2–9	12
Manuel Queiróz	Épée	3–5	7	did not advance					
Ruimondo Mayer	Épée	5–3	2	4–6	7	did not advance			
António de Menezes; Frederico Paredes; Henrique da Silveira; João Sassetti; Jorge de Paiva; Manuel Queiróz; Ruimondo Mayer	Team épée	N/A				3–1	2	2–2	4

== Shooting ==
Shooter	Event	Final	
Shooter	Event	Result	Rank
António Martins; António Ferreira; António dos Santos; Dario Canas; Hermínio Rebelo	30 metre team military pistol	1184	8
António Martins; António Ferreira; António dos Santos; Dario Canas; Hermínio Rebelo	300 metre team military rifle, prone	256	15
António Martins; António Ferreira; António dos Santos; Dario Canas; Hermínio Rebelo	300 metre team military rifle, standing	226	11
António Martins; António Ferreira; António dos Santos; Dario Canas; Hermínio Rebelo	600 metre team military rifle, prone	248	14
António Martins; António Ferreira; António dos Santos; Dario Canas; Hermínio Rebelo	300 and 600 metre team military rifle, prone	519	11
