= Gustaf Lindblom =

Gustaf Lindblom may refer to:

- Gustaf Lindblom (athlete) (1891–1960), Swedish Olympic triple-jumper
- Gustaf Lindblom (fencer) (1883–1976), Swedish Olympic fencer
