= Josef Jungmann (fencer) =

Czech fencer

Personal information
- Nationality: Czech
- Born: 5 March 1888 Prague, Austria-Hungary
- Died: 20 October 1982 (aged 94) Prague, Czechoslovakia

Sport
- Country: Czechoslovakia
- Sport: Fencing
- Event(s): Sabre, Fleuret, Epée
- Club: Riegel Praha

Josef Jungmann (5 March 1888 – 20 October 1982) was a Czech fencer, representing Czechoslovakia. He competed at four Olympic Games.

== International competitions ==
Year	Competition	Venue	Position	Event	Notes
Representing Czechoslovakia
1920	Olympic Games	Antwerp, Belgium	45th	Foil	Men
1920	Olympic Games	Antwerp, Belgium	24th	Epée	Men
1920	Olympic Games	Antwerp, Belgium	9th	Epée team	Men
1920	Olympic Games	Antwerp, Belgium	8th	Sabre team	Men
1924	Olympic Games	Paris, France	53rd	Epée	Men
1924	Olympic Games	Paris, France	4th	Sabre team	Men
1928	Olympic Games	Amsterdam, Netherland	20th	Epée	Men
1928	Olympic Games	Amsterdam, Netherland	5th	Epée team	Men
1936	Olympic Games	Berlin, Germany	11th	Sabre team	Men
