= Warholm =

Warholm is a Norwegian surname. Notable people with the surname include:

- David Warholm (1888–1971), Swedish fencer
- Harald Warholm (1920–1967), Norwegian politician
- Karsten Warholm (born 1996), Norwegian track athlete
- Sebastian Warholm (born 1995), Norwegian actor
