= Råberg =

Råberg is a Swedish surname that may refer to

- Bruno Råberg (born 1954), Swedish-born jazz bassist, composer and music professor
- Einar Råberg (1890–1957), Swedish fencer and wrestler

== See also ==
- Råbjerg Mile, a migrating coastal dune in Denmark
