= Margot Bærentzen =

Danish fencer

Personal information
- Nationality: Danish
- Born: 12 May 1907 Kongens Lyngby, Denmark
- Died: 16 October 1983 (aged 76) Gentofte, Denmark

Sport
- Sport: Fencing

Margot Jeanne Olga Emilie Bærentzen (12 May 1907 – 16 October 1983) was a Danish fencer. She competed in the women's individual foil at the 1928 Summer Olympics.

She is the daughter of fellow fencer Otto Bærentzen and sister of fencer Kim Bærentzen.
