= Ronald Bruce Campbell =

British fencer (1878–1963)

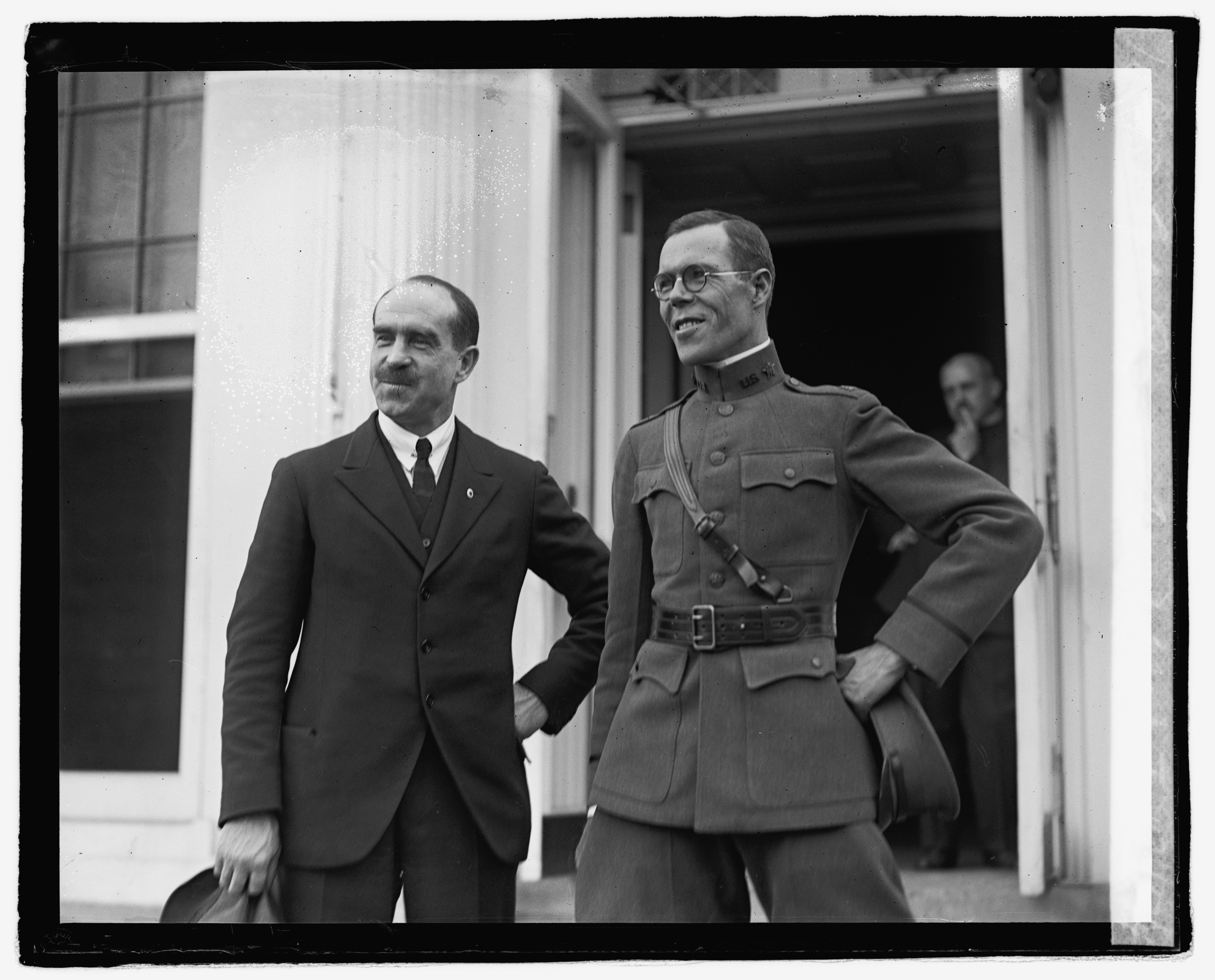

Personal information
- Nationality: British
- Born: 14 September 1878 Madras, India
- Died: 7 March 1963 (aged 84) Perth, Scotland
- Height: 5'10 (178 cm)

Sport
- Country: Great Britain
- Sport: Fencing

Colonel Ronald Bruce Campbell CBE DSO (1878–1963) was a British Army officer and Olympic fencer.

== Biography ==
Born in Madras, India, on 14 September 1878, Ronald Bruce Campbell was educated at Bedford School and at the University of Edinburgh. He served in the British Army during the Second Boer War, between 1900 and 1901, and during the First World War, between 1914 and 1918, and was promoted to the rank of colonel in the Gordon Highlanders in 1922.

Colonel Ronald Bruce Campbell was invested as a Companion of the Distinguished Service Order in 1917, and as a Commander of the Order of the British Empire in 1923.

He competed in fencing for Great Britain in the 1920 Summer Olympics. In 1929, he won the sabre title at the British Fencing Championships.

He died in Perth, Scotland, on 7 March 1963.

== Publications ==
A Ten Round Contest, 1926, The Foster Brothers, 1935, The Spirit of the Fist, 1951
