= Kim Bærentzen =

Danish fencer

Personal information
- Nationality: Danish
- Born: 8 November 1905 Copenhagen, Denmark
- Died: 18 June 1999 (aged 93) Gentofte, Denmark

Sport
- Sport: Fencing

Kim Bærentzen (8 November 1905 – 18 June 1999) was a Danish fencer. He competed at the 1928 and 1936 Summer Olympics.

He is the son of fellow fencer Otto Bærentzen and brother of fencer Margot Bærentzen.
