= John Dimond (fencer) =

American fencer

Personal information
- Born: May 9, 1892 New York, New York, United States
- Died: September 15, 1968 (aged 76) Manhattan, Kansas, United States

Sport
- Sport: Fencing

John William Dimond (May 9, 1892 – September 15, 1968) was an American épée and foil fencer. He competed in three events at the 1920 Summer Olympics.
