= Modeste Cuypers =

Belgian fencer

Personal information
- Full name: Henricus Modestus (Modeste) Cuypers
- Born: 1 April 1883 Zichem
- Died: 7 March 1944 (aged 60) Zichem

Sport
- Sport: Fencing

Modeste Cuypers (1 April 1883 – 7 March 1944) was a Belgian fencer. He competed at the 1920 and 1928 Summer Olympics.

== Trivia ==
After his death during World War 2, a street in his hometown Zichem was named after Cuypers. The official street name is "Kapt. M. Cuypersstraat", short for Captain Modest Cuypersstreet.
