= Aldo Boni =

Italian fencer (1895–1982)

Personal information
- Born: 11 March 1895 Vescovato, Cremona, Italy
- Died: 1982 (aged 86–87) Vescovato, Cremona, Italy

Sport
- Country: Italy
- Sport: Fencing
- Event(s): 1920 and 1924 Summer Olympics

Aldo Boni (11 March 1895 – 1982) was an Italian fencer. He competed at the 1920 and 1924 Summer Olympics.
