= Frédéric Dubourdieu =

French fencer

Personal information
- Born: 31 December 1879
- Died: 13 May 1944 (aged 64)

Sport
- Sport: Fencing

Frédéric Dubourdieu (31 December 1879 – 13 May 1944) was a French fencer. He competed at the 1908 and 1920 Summer Olympics.
