= Léopold Montagnier =

Swiss fencer

Personal information
- Born: 30 July 1880 Geneva, Switzerland
- Died: 6 April 1943 (aged 62) Beaulieu-sur-Mer, France

Sport
- Sport: Fencing

Léopold Louis Montagnier (30 July 1880 – 6 April 1943) was a Swiss fencer. He competed in the team épée event at the 1920 Summer Olympics.
