= Maurice de Wée =

Belgian fencer

Personal information
- Born: 25 February 1891 Brussels, Belgium
- Died: 11 January 1961 (aged 69) Bruges, Belgium

Sport
- Sport: Fencing

Maurice Jean Laurent de Wée (25 February 1891 – 1961) was a Belgian fencer. He competed in the individual épée event at the 1920 Summer Olympics.
