= Robert de Schepper =

Belgian fencer

Personal information
- Full name: Robert Émile Joseph De Schepper
- Born: 27 July 1885 Ghent, Belgium
- Died: 12 May 1940 (aged 54) Namur, Belgium

Sport
- Sport: Fencing

Robert Émile Joseph de Schepper (27 July 1885 – 12 May 1940) was a Belgian fencer. He competed in the individual and team foil events at the 1920 Summer Olympics. He was killed in action during World War II.
