= Baldo Baldi =

Italian fencer (1888–1961)

Personal information
- Born: 19 February 1888 Livorno, Italy
- Died: 21 December 1961 (aged 73) Livorno, Italy

Sport
- Sport: Fencing
Medal record
Men's fencing
Representing Italy
Olympic Games
Gold medal – first place	1920 Antwerp	Foil, team
Gold medal – first place	1920 Antwerp	Sabre, team

Baldo Baldi (19 February 1888 – 21 December 1961) was an Italian fencer. He won a gold medal in the team foil and sabre events at the 1920 Summer Olympics.
