= Francesco Gargano =

Italian fencer (1899–1975)

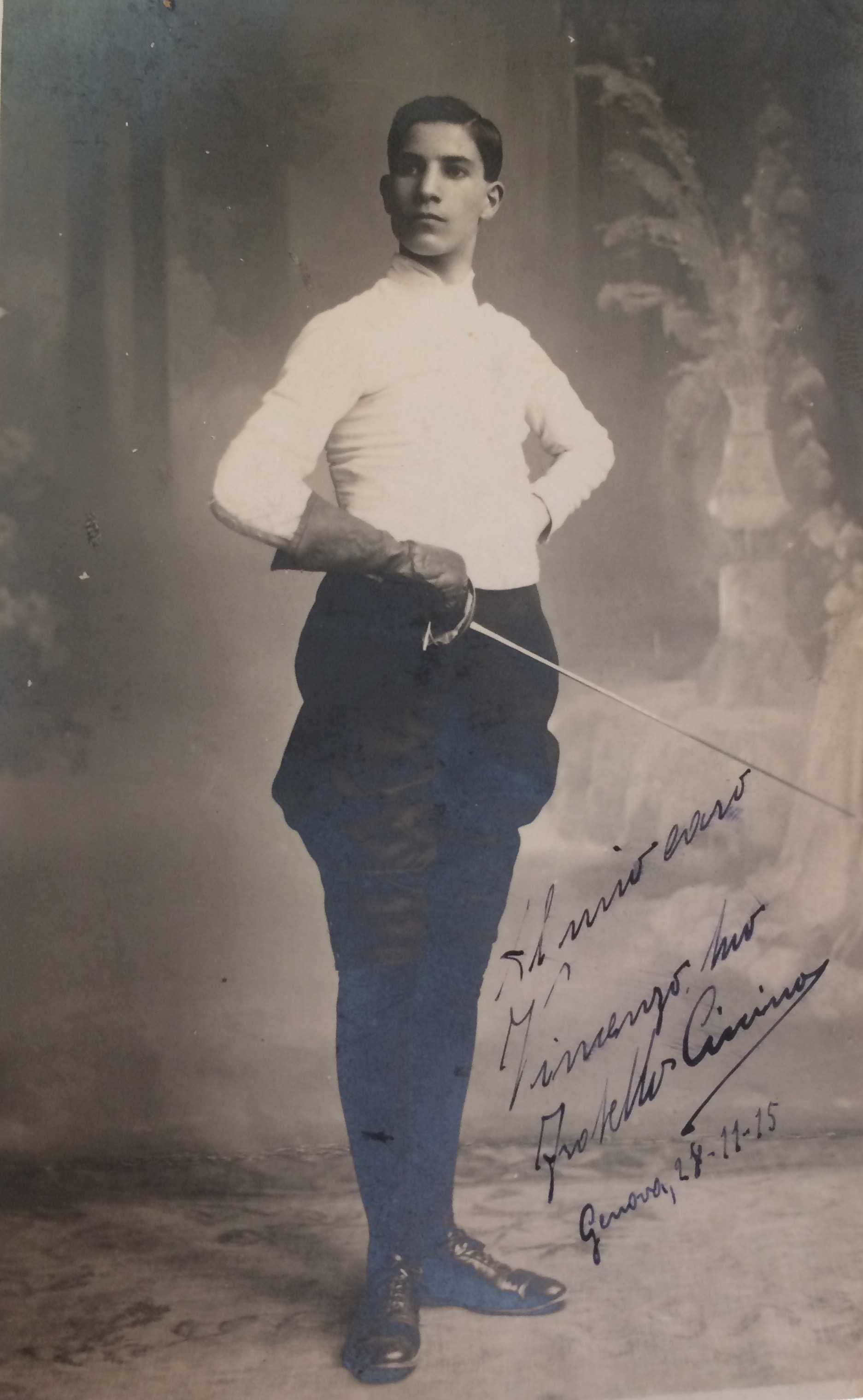

Personal information
- Born: 5 May 1899 Grammichele, Italy
- Died: 29 October 1975 (aged 76) Gothenburg, Sweden

Sport
- Sport: Fencing
Medal record
Men's fencing
Representing Italy
Olympic Games
Gold medal – first place	1920 Antwerp	Sabre, team

Francesco Gargano (5 May 1899 – 29 October 1975) was an Italian fencer. He won a gold medal in the team sabre event at the 1920 Summer Olympics.
