= Knut Enell =

Swedish fencer

Personal information
- Born: Knut Hugo Adolf Enell; 19 March 1887 Stockholm, Sweden
- Died: 9 November 1985 (aged 98) Vallentuna, Sweden

Sport
- Sport: Fencing

Knut Hugo Adolf Enell (19 March 1887 – 9 November 1985) was a Swedish officer, auditor and fencer. He competed at the 1912 and 1920 Summer Olympics.

== Career ==
Enell was born on 19 March 1887 in Stockholm, Sweden, the son of Otto Enell, a banker, and his wife Maria Forsell. He passed studentexamen in 1906 and was commissioned as an officer in the Göta Life Guards (I 2) in 1908 with the rank of underlöjtnant. Enell attended the Royal Central Gymnastics Institute from 1913 to 1915 and was promoted to lieutenant in 1914. From February to May 1918, Enell served as a regimental adjutant during an expedition to Åland. He was then commanded to follow the teaching at Centre d'instruction physique in Joinville-le-Pont, France from 1920 to 1921. Enell was promoted to captain in 1922. He left the military in 1937. He was transferred to Dalarna Regiment's (I 13) reserve in 1940.

Enell graduated from the Stockholm School of Economics in 1930 had his own audit firm in Stockholm from 1937 and he became an authorized auditor in 1940.

Enell was also a five-time Swedish floret champion and a four-time Swedish sword champion during the period 1921-1928.

== Personal life ==
Enell was married from 1910 to 1912 to Countess Blanche Hamilton (1890–1915), the daughter of Count James Hamilton and Thea Groms. Three years after they divorced, the Countess Hamilton was murdered in Rome, Italy, by her lover, the Chilean student Carlos Cienfuegos.

In 1916, Enell married Carrie Lindström (born 1895), the daughter of Carl Oscar Lindström and Ellen Bergh. He had one child with Hamilton, the son Arthur (born 1912). In his second marriage to Lindström, Enell had two children: Viveca (born 1917) and Mary (born 1922).

== Awards and decorations ==
=== Swedish ===
- (Sweden) Knight of the Order of the Sword (1930)
- (Sweden) Swedish Sports Confederation Medal of Merit in Gold (Sveriges riksidrottsförbunds förtjänstmedalj i guld)
- (Sweden) Elite Badge in Fencing (Elitmärket i fäktning)

=== Foreign ===
- Knight 1st Class of the Order of the White Rose of Finland
- (Tunisia) Knight of the Order of Glory
