= Poul Rasmussen =

Danish fencer

Personal information
- Nationality: Danish
- Born: 21 October 1896 Copenhagen, Denmark
- Died: 21 June 1966 (aged 69) Frederiksberg, Denmark

Sport
- Sport: Fencing
- Team: Fægteklubben af 1907

Poul Rasmussen (21 October 1896 – 21 June 1966) was a Danish fencer. He competed in four events at the 1920 Summer Olympics.
