= Alexandre Lippmann =

French fencer (1881–1960)

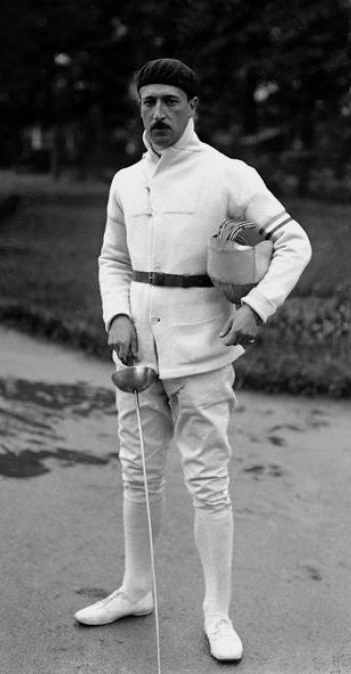
- Lippmann in 1920

Personal information
- Nationality: French
- Born: 11 June 1881 Paris, France
- Died: 23 February 1960 (aged 78) Paris, France

Sport
- Country: France
- Sport: Fencing
- Event: Épée
- Club: Cercle de l'Escrime de Paris
Medal record
Men's fencing
Representing France
Olympic Games
Gold medal – first place	1908 London	Épée, team
Silver medal – second place	1908 London	Épée, individual
Silver medal – second place	1920 Antwerp	Épée, individual
Bronze medal – third place	1920 Antwerp	Épée, team
Gold medal – first place	1924 Paris	Épée, team

Alexandre Lippmann (11 June 1881 – 23 February 1960) was a French Olympic champion épée fencer. He won two Olympic gold medals, as well as three other Olympic medals.

== Early and personal life ==
Lippmann was born in Paris, France, in the 17th arrondissement. Through his mother, Marie-Alexandrine-Henriette Dumas, he was the grandson of Alexandre Dumas fils and great-grandson of French writer Alexandre Dumas, author of The Three Musketeers. His father was Jewish. Lippmann was also a genre painter.

== Fencing career ==
In 1909, Lippmann won the French épée championship.

He won five medals, including two gold medals, at three different Olympic Games: a team gold and an individual silver in the 1908 Olympics in London at 26 years of age, a team bronze and individual silver in the 1920 Olympics in Antwerp at 38 years of age, and a team gold in the 1924 Olympics in Paris at the age of 42.

Lippmann missed out on the opportunity to fence in the 1912 and 1916 Olympic Games; French fencers did not compete at the former in Stockholm because France disagreed with the rules of the competition, and the latter were cancelled due to World War I.

== Death and legacy ==
Lippmann died in 1960 in the 8th arrondissement of Paris. He was posthumously inducted into the International Jewish Sports Hall of Fame in 1984.

== See also ==
- List of select Jewish fencers
- List of Jewish Olympic medalists
