= Louis Moureau =

French fencer

Sport
- Sport: Fencing
Medal record
Men's fencing
Representing France
Olympic Games
Bronze medal – third place	1920 Antwerp	Épée, Team

Louis Moreau was a French fencer. He won a bronze medal in the team épée event at the 1920 Summer Olympics.
