= Raymond Dutcher =

American fencer

Personal information
- Born: February 2, 1885 Elizabeth, New Jersey, United States
- Died: August 10, 1975 (aged 90) Ridgewood, New Jersey, United States

Sport
- Sport: Fencing

Raymond Woodruff Dutcher (February 2, 1885 – October 8, 1975) was an American fencer. He competed in the individual and team épée events at the 1920 Summer Olympics.
