= Louis de Tribolet =

Swiss fencer

Albert de Tribolet
Personal information
- Full name: Charles Albert de Tribolet-Hardy
- Born: 12 October 1882
- Died: 28 August 1972 (aged 89) Val-de-Ruz, Switzerland

Sport
- Sport: Fencing

Albert de Tribolet (12 October 1882 – 28 August 1972) was a Swiss fencer. He competed in the individual and team épée events at the 1920 Summer Olympics.
