= Charles Notley =

British fencer (1879–1968)

Barry Notley
Personal information
- Full name: Charles Barrimore Notley
- Born: 23 December 1879 Hackney, London, England
- Died: 1968 (aged 88–89) Andover, Hampshire, England

Sport
- Country: England
- Sport: Fencing

Charles Barrimore Notley (23 December 1879 – 1968), better known as Barry Notley, was a British fencer. He competed at four Olympic Games. In 1925 and 1927, he won the épée title at the British Fencing Championships.
