= Kay Schrøder =

Danish architect and fencer

Personal information
- Born: 1 July 1877 Copenhagen, Denmark
- Died: 25 April 1949 (aged 71) Copenhagen, Denmark

Sport
- Sport: Fencing

Kay Schrøder (1 July 1877 – 25 April 1949) was a Danish fencer and architect. He competed in three fencing events at the 1920 Summer Olympics. He also competed in the architecture event in the art competition at the 1924 Summer Olympics.
