= Fernando Correia =

Portuguese fencer

Personal information
- Born: 1880
- Died: Unknown

Sport
- Sport: Fencing

Fernando Correia (born 1880, date of death unknown) was a Portuguese fencer. He competed in the individual épée event at the 1912 and 1920 Summer Olympics.
