= Henri Wijnoldy Daniëls =

Dutch fencer (1889–1932)

Personal information
- Full name: Henri Jacob Marie Wijnoldy Daniëls
- Born: 26 November 1889 Sliedrecht, Netherlands
- Died: 20 August 1932 (aged 42) Cabourg, France

Sport
- Sport: Fencing
Medal record
Men's fencing
Representing Netherlands
Olympic Games
Bronze medal – third place	1920 Antwerp	Sabre, team
Bronze medal – third place	1924 Paris	Sabre, team

Henri Jacob Marie Wijnoldy Daniëls (26 November 1889 – 20 August 1932) was a Dutch épée, foil and sabre fencer. He won a bronze medal in the team sabre events at the 1920 and 1924 Summer Olympics.
