= Gaston Amson =

French fencer (1883–1960)

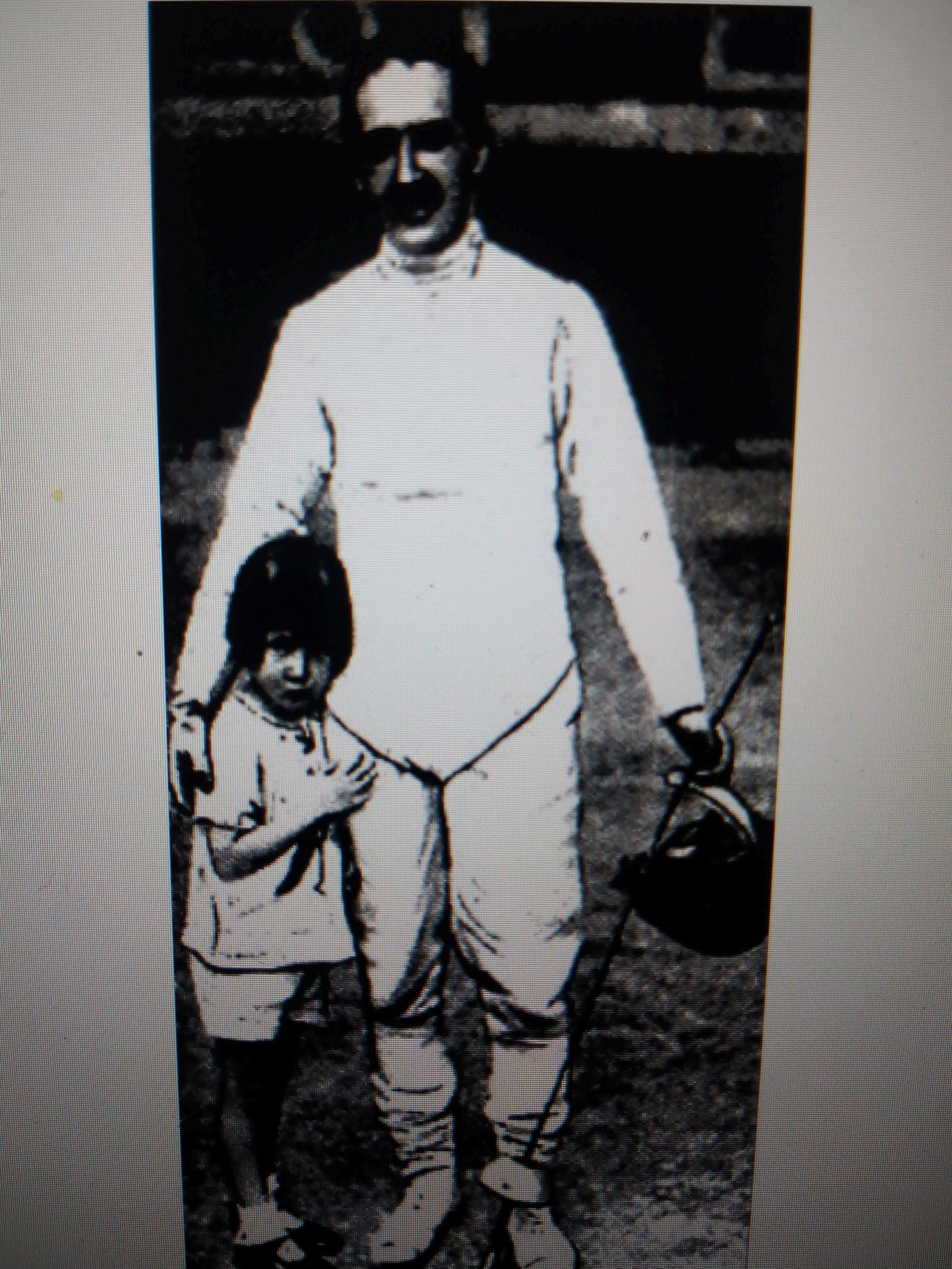
- Gaston Amson, fencing, 1919

Personal information
- Born: 17 November 1883 Paris, France
- Died: 16 July 1960 (aged 76) Paris, France

Sport
- Sport: Fencing
Medal record
Men's fencing
Representing France
Olympic Games
Silver medal – second place	1920 Antwerp	Foil, team
Bronze medal – third place	1920 Antwerp	Épée, team
Silver medal – second place	1928 Amsterdam	Épée, team

Gaston Marcel Amson (17 November 1883 – 16 July 1960) was a French fencer. He won a silver and a bronze medal at the 1920 Summer Olympics and a silver at the 1928 Summer Olympics.
