= Leon Schoonmaker =

American fencer

Leonard Schoonmaker
Personal information
- Born: March 27, 1882 Singac, New Jersey, United States
- Died: May 30, 1950 (aged 68) Tulsa, Oklahoma, United States

Sport
- Sport: Fencing

Leon Monroe Schoonmaker (March 27, 1882 – May 30, 1950) was an American fencer. He competed in the individual foil and épée events at the 1920 Summer Olympics. He was a referee in several fencing competitions at the 1932 Summer Olympics in Los Angeles. In the 1930s, he served first as a secretary and treasurer and then for the term of 1934-1935 as the president of the Fencing Association of the United States. He was also an engineer in Queens, New York City.

== See also ==
- List of Princeton University Olympians
