= Jan Černohorský =

Czech fencer

Personal information
- Born: 25 November 1898 Prague
- Died: 1 November 1976 (aged 77) Prague

Sport
- Sport: Fencing

Jan Černohorský (25 November 1898 – 1 November 1976) was a Czechoslovak fencer. He competed at the 1920 and 1928 Summer Olympics.
