= Andrea Marrazzi =

Italian fencer (1887–1972)

Personal information
- Born: 2 October 1887 Livorno, Italy
- Died: 18 October 1972 (aged 85) Livorno, Italy

Sport
- Sport: Fencing
Medal record
Men's fencing
Representing Italy
Olympic Games
Gold medal – first place	1920 Antwerp	Épée, team

Andrea Marrazzi (2 October 1887 – 18 October 1972) was an Italian fencer. He won a gold medal in the team épée event at the 1920 Summer Olympics.
