= Fernand de Montigny =

Belgian fencer and hockey player

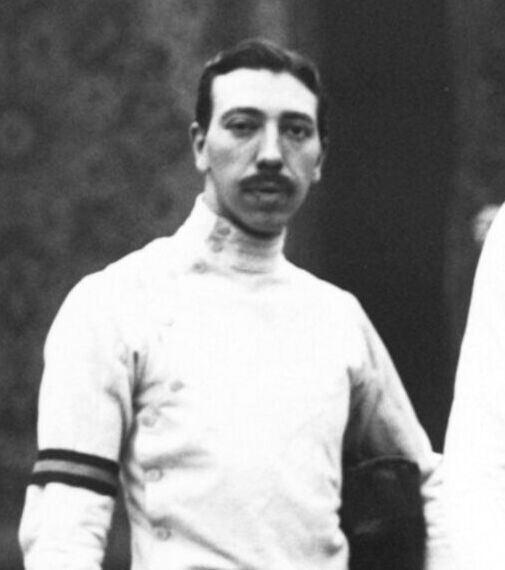

Personal information
- Full name: Fernand Alphonse Marie Frédéric de Montigny
- Born: 5 January 1885 Anzegem, Belgium
- Died: 2 January 1974 (aged 88) Antwerp, Belgium

Sport
- Sport: Fencing, field hockey
Medal record
Men's fencing and field hockey
Representing Belgium
Intercalated Games
Bronze medal – third place	1906 Athens	Épée, team
Olympic Games
Bronze medal – third place	1908 London	Épée, team
Bronze medal – third place	1920 Antwerp	Field hockey
Silver medal – second place	1924 Paris	Foil, team
Silver medal – second place	1924 Paris	Épée, team

Fernand Alphonse Marie Frédéric de Montigny (French pronunciation: [fɛʁnɑ̃ alfɔ̃s maʁi fʁedeʁik də mɔ̃tiɲi]; 5 January 1885 – 2 January 1974) was a Belgian fencer and hockey player. He won two silver medals and two bronze in fencing and a bronze in hockey. He was also the architect of the 1920 Olympic Stadium.

== Olympic events ==
- 1906 Intercalated Games in Athens
  - Fencing – Épée, individual
  - Fencing – Épée, team – Bronze medal
  - Fencing – Foil, individual
- 1908 Summer Olympics in London
  - Fencing – Épée, individual
  - Fencing – Épée, team – Bronze medal
- 1912 Summer Olympics in Stockholm
  - Fencing – Épée, individual
  - Fencing – Épée, team
  - Fencing – Foil, individual
- 1920 Summer Olympics in Antwerp
  - Fencing – Épée, individual
  - Fencing – Foil, individual
  - Fencing – Foil, team
  - Field hockey – Bronze medal
- 1924 Summer Olympics in Paris
  - Fencing – Épée, team – Silver medal
  - Fencing – Foil, team – Silver medal
