= Antonio Allochio =

Italian fencer (1888–1956)

Personal information
- Born: 20 September 1888 Paitone, Italy
- Died: 18 July 1956 (aged 67) Brescia, Italy

Sport
- Sport: Fencing
Medal record
Men's fencing
Representing Italy
Olympic Games
Gold medal – first place	1920 Antwerp	Épée, team

Antonio Allochio (20 September 1888 – 18 July 1956) was an Italian fencer. He won a gold medal in the team épée event at the 1920 Summer Olympics.
