= Armand Massard =

French fencer (1884–1971)

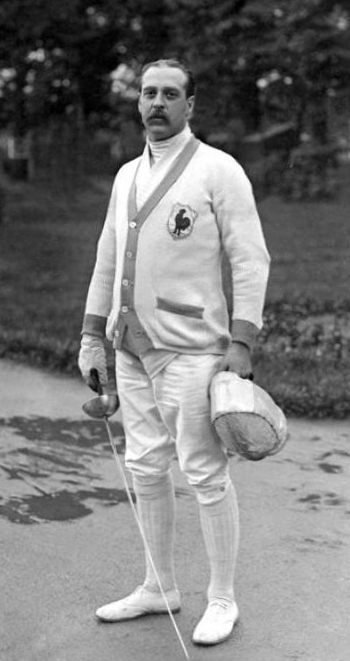

Personal information
- Born: 1 December 1884 Paris, France
- Died: 9 April 1971 (aged 86) Paris, France
- Height: 1.86 m (6 ft 1 in)
- Weight: 84 kg (185 lb)

Sport
- Sport: Fencing
- Event: épée
Medal record
Men's fencing
Representing France
Olympic Games
Gold medal – first place	1920 Antwerp	Individual épée
Bronze medal – third place	1920 Antwerp	Team épée
Silver medal – second place	1928 Amsterdam	Team épée

Armand Émile Nicolas Massard (1 December 1884 – 8 April 1971) was a French épée fencer who competed at the 1920, 1924 and 1928 Summer Olympics. In 1920 he won an individual gold and team bronze medal, and in 1928 he earned a team silver medal.

Massard was a journalist and the editor-in-chief of La Presse, La Liberté and Le Figaro. He was president of the French Fencing Federation and of the Comité National Olympique et Sportif Français from 1933 to 1967. In 1946 he became a member of the International Olympic Committee (IOC), and in 1969 its honorary member; he served as the IOC Executive Board Member in 1950–51 and 1956–57, and as Vice-President in 1952–55. Massard was also Vice-President of the Municipal Council of Paris.

== Olympic events ==
- 1920 Summer Olympics in Antwerp
  - Fencing – Épée, individual – Gold medal
  - Fencing – Épée, team – Bronze medal
- 1924 Summer Olympics in Paris
  - Fencing – Épée, individual
- 1928 Summer Olympics in Amsterdam
  - Fencing – Épée, individual
  - Fencing – Épée, team – Silver medal
