= Otakar Švorčík =

Czech fencer

Personal information
- Born: 7 December 1886 Prague, Austria-Hungary
- Died: 18 September 1955 (aged 68) Prague, Czechoslovakia

Sport
- Sport: Fencing

Otakar Švorčík (7 December 1886 – 18 September 1955) was a Czech fencer. He competed at three Olympic Games.
