= Rodolfo Terlizzi =

Italian fencer

Personal information
- Born: 17 October 1896 Florence, Italy
- Died: 11 July 1971 (aged 74) Florence, Italy

Sport
- Sport: Fencing
Medal record
Men's fencing
Representing Italy
Olympic Games
Gold medal – first place	1920 Antwerp	Foil, team
Silver medal – second place	1932 Los Angeles	Foil, team

Rodolfo Angiolo Giuseppe Antonio Terlizzi (17 October 1896 – 11 July 1971) was an Italian fencer. He won a gold medal in the team foil event at the 1920 Summer Olympics and a silver in the same event at the 1932 Summer Olympics.
