= Pietro Speciale =

Italian fencer (1876–1945)

Personal information
- Born: 29 September 1876 Palermo, Italy
- Died: 9 November 1945 (aged 69) Palermo, Italy

Sport
- Sport: Fencing
Medal record
Men's fencing
Representing Italy
Olympic Games
Silver medal – second place	1912 Stockholm	Foil, Individual
Gold medal – first place	1920 Antwerp	Foil, Team

Pietro Speciale (29 September 1876 – 9 November 1945) was an Italian fencer. He won a silver medal in the individual foil event at the 1912 Summer Olympics and a gold in the team foil at the 1920 Summer Olympics.
