= Federico Cesarano =

Italian fencer (1886–1969)

Personal information
- Born: 5 July 1886 Padua, Italy
- Died: 22 February 1969 (aged 82) Milan, Italy

Sport
- Sport: Fencing, sport shooter
Medal record
Men's fencing
Representing Italy
Olympic Games
Gold medal – first place	1920 Antwerp	Sabre, team
Intercalated Games
Bronze medal – third place	1906 Athens	Sabre, individual

Federico Secondo Benvenuto Cesarano (5 July 1886 – 22 January 1969) was an Italian fencer and sport shooter. He won a bronze medal in the individual sabre event at the 1906 Intercalated Games. He also won the gold medal in the team sabre in the fencing at the 1920 Summer Olympics.
