= Einar Råberg =

Swedish fencer

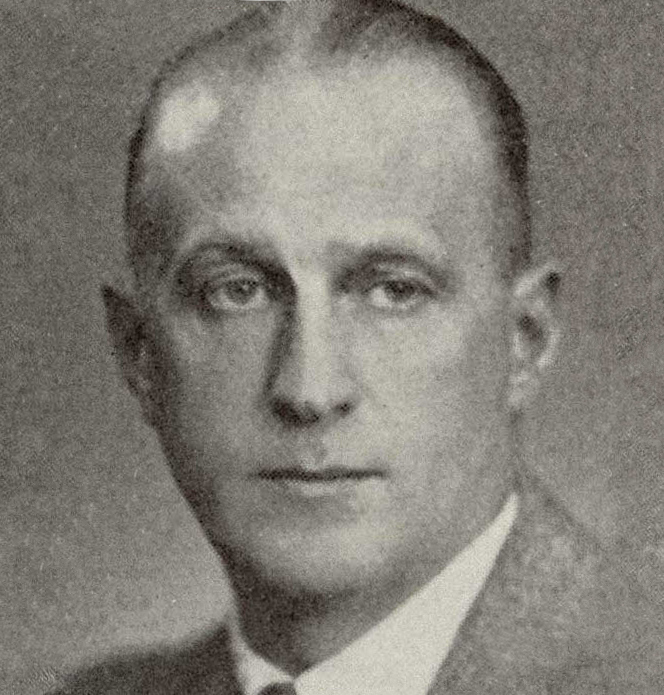

Personal information
- Nationality: Swedish
- Born: 26 July 1890 Kalmar, Sweden
- Died: 2 January 1957 (aged 66) Stockholm, Sweden

Sport
- Sport: Fencing, Wrestling

Einar Råberg (26 July 1890 – 2 January 1957) was a Swedish fencer and wrestler. As a fencer, he competed in the individual épée event at the 1920 Summer Olympics.

After his active athletic career, his organizational skills led to his serving as chairman of a variety of Swedish and international sports federations. Being especially fond of wrestling, he was elected the first president of the Swedish Wrestling Federation in 1920 and also the first president of the International Amateur Wrestling Federation (IAWF), which was later renamed the International Federation of Associated Wrestling Styles, after its creation in Lausanne in 1921. After resigning from the position in 1924, he later continued as vice president of the same organization from 1930 to 1948. He was a member of the Swedish Olympic Committee (SOK) from 1924 to 1948 and chairman of the Swedish Sports Confederation from 1939 to 1951.

Einar Råberg represented Sweden as flag bearer in the opening ceremony of the 1924 Summer Olympics and as "Chef de Mission" in the 1948 Winter Olympics.
