= Hans Törnblom =

Swedish fencer

Personal information
- Born: 22 December 1888 Eksjö, Sweden
- Died: 15 July 1973 (aged 84) Stockholm, Sweden

Sport
- Sport: Fencing

Hans Samuel Törnblom (22 December 1888 – 15 July 1973) was a Swedish fencer. He competed in the individual foil and épée events at the 1920 Summer Olympics.
