= Félix Vigeveno =

Dutch fencer (1881–1955)

Personal information
- Born: 25 March 1881 Amsterdam, Netherlands
- Died: 6 September 1955 (aged 74) Uccle, Belgium

Sport
- Sport: Fencing

Félix Vigeveno (25 March 1881 – 6 September 1955) was a Dutch épée, foil and sabre fencer. He competed at three Olympic Games.
