= William Russell (fencer) =

American fencer

Personal information
- Born: January 18, 1896 New York, New York, United States
- Died: October 18, 1958 (aged 62) Glen Cove, New York, United States

Sport
- Sport: Fencing

William Hamilton Russell (January 18, 1896 – October 18, 1958) was an American épée fencer. He competed at the 1920 and 1924 Summer Olympics. He graduated from Harvard University.
