= Roland Willoughby =

British fencer (1870–1954)

Personal information
- Born: 6 September 1870 Marylebone, London, England
- Died: 15 February 1954 (aged 83) Chelsea, London, England
- Height: 178 cm (5 ft 10 in)

Sport
- Sport: Fencing
- Club: London Fencing Club

Roland Moffatt Perowne Willoughby (6 September 1870 – 15 February 1954) was a British fencer. He competed at the 1920 and 1924 Summer Olympics. In 1914, he won the foil title at the British Fencing Championships.
