= Otto Bærentzen =

Danish fencer

Personal information
- Nationality: Danish
- Born: 31 May 1868 Frederiksberg, Denmark
- Died: 20 May 1943 (aged 74)

Sport
- Sport: Fencing

Otto Henri Bærentzen (31 May 1868 – 20 May 1943) was a Danish fencer. He competed at the 1920 and 1928 Summer Olympics.

He is the father of fellow fencers Margot Bærentzen and Kim Bærentzen.
