= Joseph De Craecker =

Belgian fencer

Personal information
- Born: 19 January 1891 Antwerp, Belgium
- Died: 25 October 1975 (aged 84)

Sport
- Sport: Fencing
Medal record
Men's fencing
Representing Belgium
Olympic Games
Silver medal – second place	1920 Antwerp	Épée, team
Silver medal – second place	1924 Paris	Épée, team

Joseph Ghislain Henri Maria De Craecker (19 January 1891 – 23 October 1975) was a Belgian fencer. He won two silver medals in the team épée competitions at the 1920 and 1924 Summer Olympics.
