= Robert Sears (sportsman) =

American fencer

Robert W. Sears
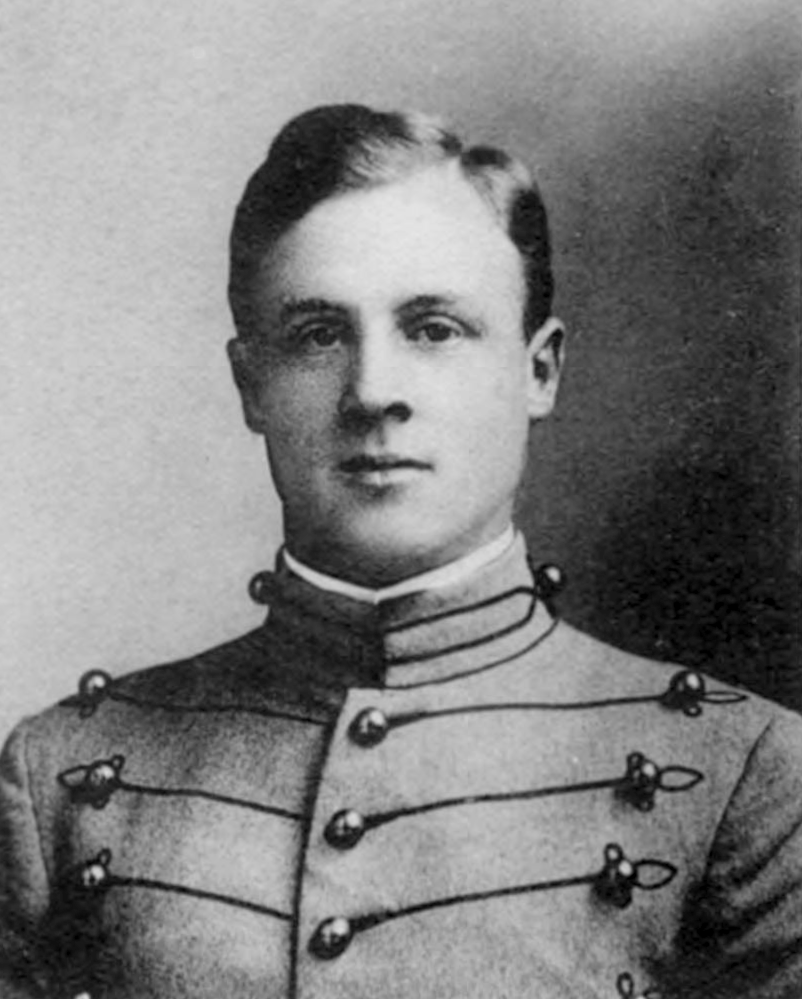
- At West Point in 1909

Personal information
- Born: November 30, 1884 Portland, Oregon, United States
- Died: January 9, 1979 (aged 94) Atlanta, Georgia, United States

Sport
- Sport: Fencing, modern pentathlon
Medal record
Men's fencing
Representing United States
Olympic Games
Bronze medal – third place	1920 Antwerp	Foil, team

Robert Wilson Sears (November 30, 1884 – January 9, 1979) was an American épée and foil fencer and modern pentathlete. He won a bronze medal in the team foil event at the 1920 Summer Olympics.

A 1909 graduate of the United States Military Academy at West Point, New York, with George S. Patton, Jacob L. Devers and William Hood Simpson among his fellow graduates, he was captain of the Army team that twice won the IFA foil team title. In 1909, he shared individual honors with his teammate, Reginald Cocroft. At the 1920 Olympics, Sears won a bronze medal in foil team at the age of 36, competed in the épée team event, and finished eighth in the modern pentathlon.

Sears spent most of his military career as an Ordnance officer, but during World War II was commander of the 137th Infantry Regiment in the 35th Infantry Division in France. At the age of 60, he was the oldest combat soldier in the European Theater of Operations. He retired in 1946 with the rank of colonel.

He died in Atlanta on January 9, 1979.
