= Manuel Queiróz =

Portuguese fencer

Personal information
- Born: 1883
- Died: Unknown

Sport
- Sport: Fencing

Manuel Teixeira de Queiróz (born 1883, date of death unknown) was a Portuguese épée and foil fencer. He competed at the 1920 and 1924 Summer Olympics.
