= Dino Urbani =

Italian fencer (1882–1958)

Personal information
- Born: 8 March 1882 Livorno, Italy
- Died: 9 May 1958 (aged 76) Varese, Italy

Sport
- Sport: Fencing
Medal record
Men's fencing
Representing Italy
Olympic Games
Gold medal – first place	1920 Antwerp	Sabre, team
Gold medal – first place	1920 Antwerp	Épée, team

Dino Urbani (8 March 1882 – 9 May 1958) was an Italian fencer who took part in the 1920 Olympics in Antwerp.

Urbani was an Olympic champion in fencing twice. He was part of the Italian team that won the team competitions both in epee and foil.
