= Georg Hegner =

Danish fencer

Personal information
- Born: 24 June 1897 Copenhagen, Denmark
- Died: 17 February 1985 (aged 87) Sjælland, Denmark

Sport
- Sport: Fencing

Georg Hegner (24 June 1897 – 17 February 1985) was a Danish épée and foil fencer. He competed in four events at the 1920 Summer Olympics.
