= Tommaso Costantino =

Italian fencer (1885–1950)

Personal information
- Born: 23 June 1885 Tunis, Tunisia
- Died: 28 February 1950 (aged 64) Brindisi, Italy

Sport
- Sport: Fencing
Medal record
Men's fencing
Representing Italy
Olympic Games
Gold medal – first place	1920 Antwerp	Foil, team
Gold medal – first place	1920 Antwerp	Épée, team

Tommaso Costantino (23 June 1885 – 28 February 1950) was an Italian fencer. He won two gold medals at the 1920 Summer Olympics.
