= Gustave Buchard =

French fencer (1890–1977)

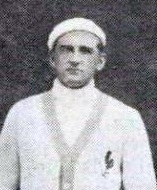
- Gustave Buchard, médaillé de bronze à l'épée par équipe aux JO de 1920

Personal information
- Born: 17 February 1890 Le Havre, France
- Died: 18 February 1977 (aged 87)

Sport
- Sport: Fencing
Medal record
Men's fencing
Representing France
Olympic Games
Bronze medal – third place	1920 Antwerp	Épée, Individual
Bronze medal – third place	1920 Antwerp	Épée, Team

Gustave Jean Armand Buchard (17 February 1890 – 18 February 1977) was a French fencer who took part in the 1920 Olympic Games in Antwerp. Bushard won two Olympic medals in fencing at the 1920 Summer Olympics in Antwerp. He came in third place in both the individual and team epee.
