= Tullio Bozza =

Italian fencer (1891–1922)

Personal information
- Born: 3 February 1891 Naples, Italy
- Died: 13 February 1922 (aged 31) Naples, Italy

Sport
- Sport: Fencing
Medal record
Men's fencing
Representing Italy
Olympic Games
Gold medal – first place	1920 Antwerp	Épée, team

Tullio Bozza (3 February 1891 – 13 February 1922) was an Italian fencer. He won a gold medal in the team épée event at the 1920 Summer Olympics.
