= Ernest Gevers =

Belgian fencer

Personal information
- Born: 28 August 1891 Antwerp, Belgium
- Died: 23 July 1965 (aged 73)

Sport
- Sport: Fencing
Medal record
Men's fencing
Representing Belgium
Olympic Games
Silver medal – second place	1920 Antwerp	Épée, team
Silver medal – second place	1924 Paris	Épée, team

Ernest Jules Henri Jean Marie Gevers (28 August 1891 – 23 July 1965) was a Belgian fencer. He won two silver medals in the team épée competitions at the 1920 and the 1924 Summer Olympics.
