= Lionel Bony de Castellane =

French fencer (1891–1965)

Personal information
- Born: 28 September 1891 Gardegan-et-Tourtirac, France
- Died: 29 November 1965 (aged 74) Béziers, France

Sport
- Sport: Fencing
Medal record
Men's fencing
Representing France
Olympic Games
Silver medal – second place	1920 Antwerp	Foil, team

Lionel Bony de Castellane (28 September 1891 – 29 November 1965) was a French fencer. He won a silver medal in the team foil event at the 1920 Summer Olympics.
