= Georges Casanova =

French fencer (1890–1932)

Personal information
- Born: 26 July 1890 Algiers, French Algeria
- Died: 20 February 1932 (aged 41)

Sport
- Sport: Fencing
Medal record
Men's fencing
Representing France
Olympic Games
Bronze medal – third place	1920 Antwerp	Épée, Team

Auguste Georges Casanova (26 July 1890 – 20 February 1932) was a French fencer. He won a bronze medal in the team épée event at the 1920 Summer Olympics.
