= Marcel Perrot =

French fencer (1879–1969)

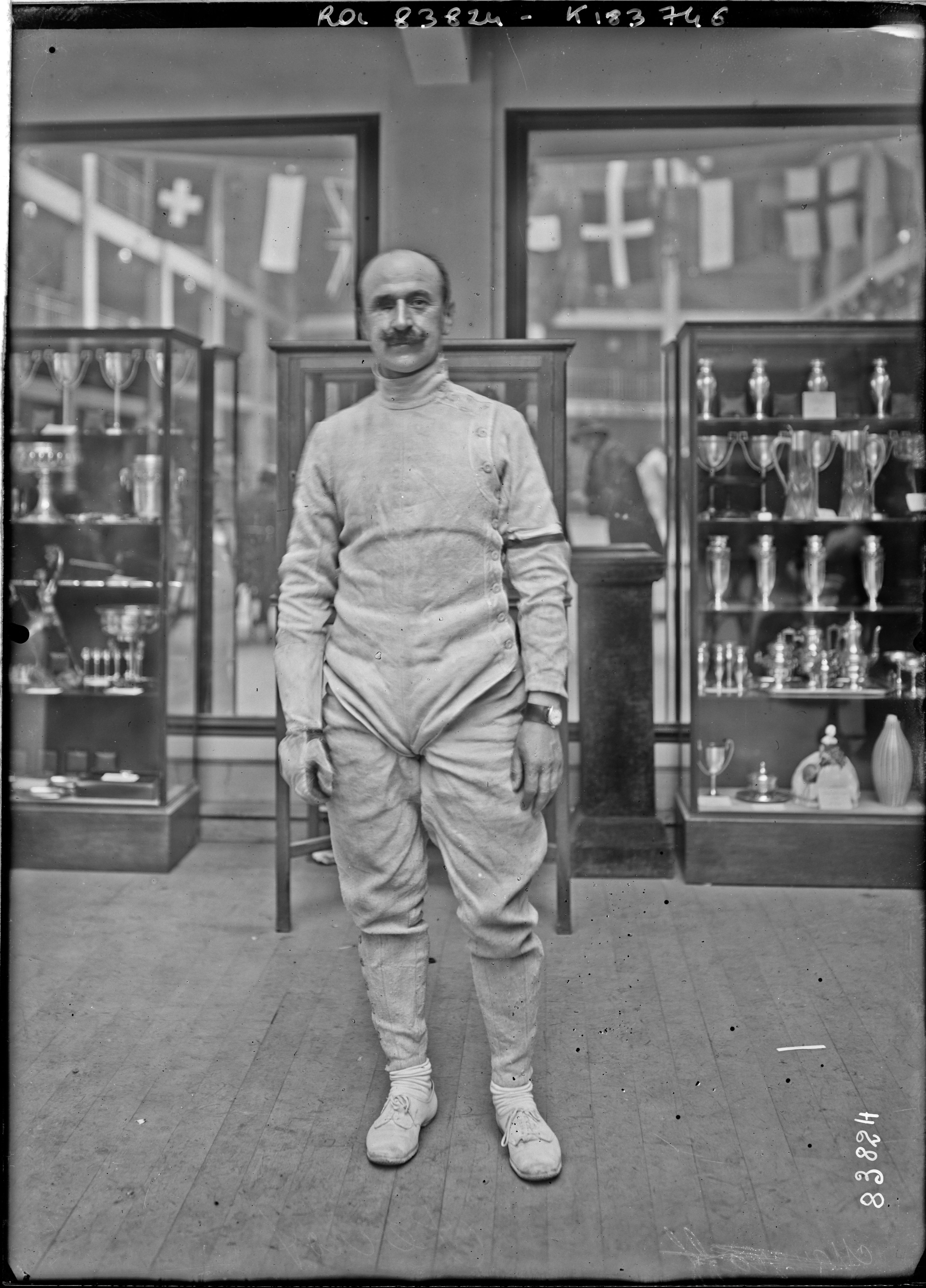
- Perrot in 1923.

Personal information
- Born: 24 February 1879 Vendôme, France
- Died: 16 July 1969 (aged 90) Deauville, France

Sport
- Sport: Fencing
Medal record
Men's fencing
Representing France
Olympic Games
Silver medal – second place	1920 Antwerp	Foil, team

Marcel Léon Jacques Perrot (English: /pɛˈroʊ/ peh-ROH, French: [maʁsɛl leɔ̃ ʒak pɛʁo]; 24 February 1879 – 16 July 1969) was a French fencer. He won a silver medal in the team foil event at the 1920 Summer Olympics.
