= Giovanni Canova =

Italian fencer (1880–1960)

Personal information
- Born: 27 July 1880 Canicattì, Province of Agrigento, Italy
- Died: 28 October 1960 (aged 80) Turin, Italy

Sport
- Sport: Fencing
Medal record
Men's fencing
Representing Italy
Olympic Games
| Gold medal – first place | 1920 Antwerp | Épée, team |
| Bronze medal – third place | 1924 Paris | Épée, team |

Giovanni Canova (27 July 1880 – 28 October 1960) was an Italian fencer. He won a gold medal at the 1920 Summer Olympics and a bronze at the 1924 Summer Olympics.
