= Louis Delaunoij =

Dutch fencer (1879–1947)

Personal information
- Born: 3 March 1879 Amsterdam, Netherlands
- Died: 29 October 1947 (aged 68) Bussum, Netherlands

Sport
- Sport: Fencing
Medal record
Men's fencing
Representing Netherlands
Olympic Games
Bronze medal – third place	1920 Antwerp	Sabre, team

Louis Delaunoij (3 March 1879 – 29 October 1947) was a Dutch fencer. He won a bronze medal in the team sabre event at the 1920 Summer Olympics.
