= Ruimondo Mayer =

Portuguese fencer

Personal information
- Full name: Ruimondo Ferro Mayer
- Born: 30 December 1888 Mercês, Lisbon, Portugal
- Died: September 1959

Sport
- Sport: Fencing

Ruimondo Ferro Mayer (30 December 1888 – September 1959) was a Portuguese fencer. He competed in the individual and team Épée events at the 1920 and 1924 Summer Olympics.
