= David Warholm =

Swedish fencer

Personal information
- Born: 26 November 1888 Lysekil, Sweden
- Died: 29 July 1971 (aged 82) Stockholm, Sweden

Sport
- Sport: Fencing

Achievements and titles
- World finals: 1920 Summer Olympics

Claes David Warholm (26 November 1888 – 29 July 1971) was a Swedish fencer. He competed in the individual and team épée events at the 1920 Summer Olympics.
