= Jan van der Wiel =

Dutch fencer (1892–1962)

Personal information
- Born: 31 May 1892 Breda, Netherlands
- Died: 24 November 1962 (aged 70) The Hague, Netherlands

Sport
- Sport: Fencing
Medal record
Men's fencing
Representing Netherlands
Olympic Games
Bronze medal – third place	1920 Antwerp	Sabre, team
Bronze medal – third place	1924 Paris	Sabre, team

Jan van der Wiel (31 May 1892 – 24 November 1962) was a Dutch épée, foil and sabre fencer. He won a bronze medal at the 1920 Summer Olympics and the 1924 Summer Olympics in the team sabre competitions.
