= Georges Trombert =

French fencer (1874–1949)

Personal information
- Born: 10 August 1874 Geneva, Switzerland
- Died: 27 February 1949 (aged 74) Lyon, France

Sport
- Sport: Fencing
Medal record
Men's fencing
Representing France
Olympic Games
Silver medal – second place	1920 Antwerp	Sabre, team
Silver medal – second place	1920 Antwerp	Foil, team
Bronze medal – third place	1920 Antwerp	Épée, team

Georges Auguste Ernest Trombert (10 August 1874 – 27 February 1949) was a French fencer, who won 2 silver and 1 bronze medals during the 1920 Summer Olympics.
