= João Sassetti =

Portuguese fencer

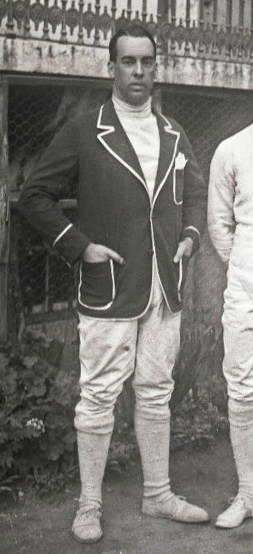
- Sassetti at the 1928 Olympics

Personal information
- Born: 22 January 1892 Lisbon, Portugal
- Died: 28 May 1946 (aged 54) Lisbon, Portugal

Sport
- Sport: Fencing
- Event: Épée
Medal record
Representing Portugal
Olympic Games
Bronze medal – third place	1928 Amsterdam	Épée, team

João Vicente de Freitas Branco Sassetti (22 January 1892 – 28 May 1946) was a Portuguese épée fencer. He competed individually at the 1920 Summer Olympics and with the Portuguese team in 1920, 1928 and 1936, and won a team bronze medal in 1928, placing fourth in 1920.
