= Jorge de Paiva =

Portuguese fencer

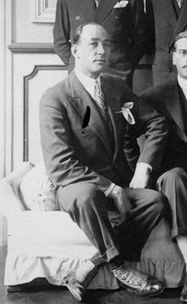
- Jorge de Paiva in 1929

Personal information
- Born: 13 May 1887
- Died: 12 May 1937 (aged 49)

Sport
- Sport: Fencing
- Event: Épée
Medal record
Representing Portugal
Olympic Games
Bronze medal – third place	1928 Amsterdam	Épée, team

Jorge de Paiva (13 May 1887 – 12 May 1937) was a Portuguese épée fencer. He competed individually at the 1920 Summer Olympics and with the Portuguese team in 1920, 1924 and 1928, and won a team bronze medal in 1928, placing fourth in 1920 and 1924.
