= Willem Hubert van Blijenburgh =

Dutch fencer (1881–1936)

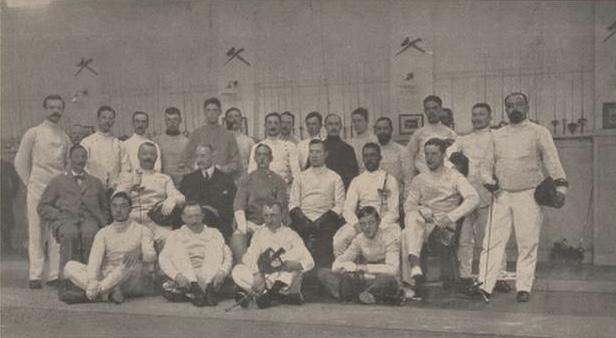
- Van Geuns in 1912

Personal information
- Born: 11 July 1881 Zwolle, Netherlands
- Died: 14 October 1936 (aged 55) Bilthoven, Netherlands

Sport
- Sport: Fencing
Medal record
Men's fencing
Representing Netherlands
Olympic Games
Bronze medal – third place	1912 Stockholm	Épée, team
Bronze medal – third place	1912 Stockholm	Sabre, team
Bronze medal – third place	1920 Antwerp	Sabre, team

Willem Peter Hubert van Blijenburgh (11 July 1881 – 14 October 1936) was a Dutch fencer. He won three bronze medals.
