= Gustaf Lindblom (fencer) =

Swedish fencer

Personal information
- Born: 19 August 1883 Stockholm, Sweden
- Died: 16 March 1976 (aged 92) Stockholm, Sweden

Sport
- Country: Sweden
- Sport: Fencing

Gustaf Torbjörn Lindblom (19 August 1883 – 16 March 1976) was a Swedish épée and foil fencer. He competed at four Olympic Games.
