= Salomon Zeldenrust =

Dutch fencer (1884–1958)

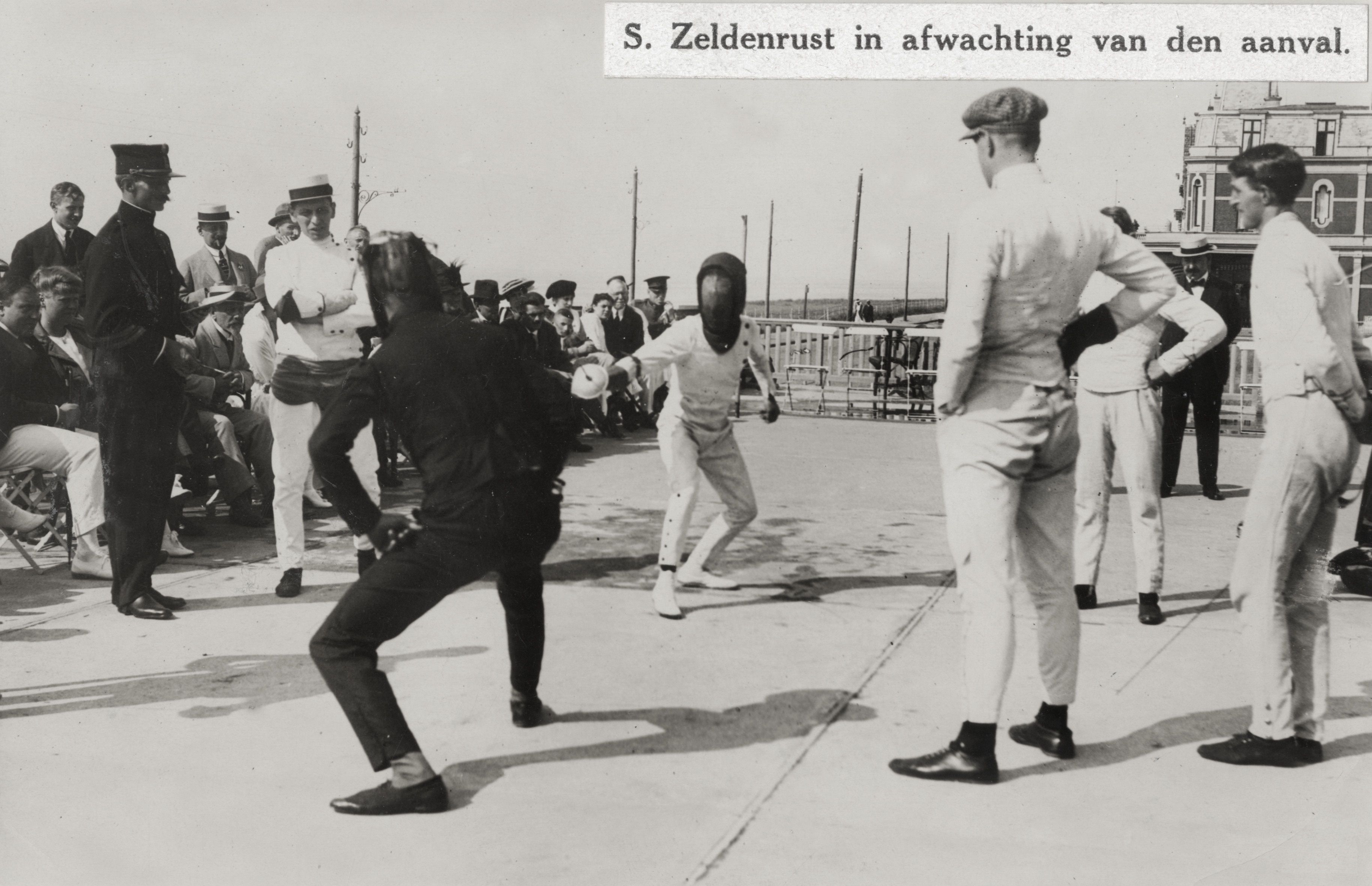

Personal information
- Born: 17 February 1884 Amsterdam, Netherlands
- Died: 20 July 1958 (aged 74) Knokke, Belgium

Sport
- Sport: Fencing
Medal record
Men's fencing
Representing Netherlands
Olympic Games
Bronze medal – third place	1920 Antwerp	Sabre, team

Salomon Zeldenrust (17 February 1884 – 20 July 1958) was a Dutch épée, foil and sabre fencer. He won a bronze medal in the team sabre event at the 1920 Summer Olympics.
