= List of Olympic medalists for Cuba =

This is a full list of all Cuban medalists, for more information about Cuba at the Summer Olympics click here

== List of medalists ==
Medal	Name	Games	Sport	Event
Gold	Ramón Fonst	(France) 1900 Paris	Fencing	Men's épée
Silver	Ramón Fonst	(France) 1900 Paris	Fencing	Men's amateurs-masters épée
Gold	Ramón Fonst	(United States) 1904 St. Louis	Fencing	Men's épée
Gold	Ramón Fonst	(United States) 1904 St. Louis	Fencing	Men's foil
Gold	Manuel Díaz	(United States) 1904 St. Louis	Fencing	Men's sabre
Gold	Albertson Van Zo Post	(United States) 1904 St. Louis	Fencing	Men's singletick
Silver	Charles Tatham	(United States) 1904 St. Louis	Fencing	Men's épée
Silver	Albertson Van Zo Post	(United States) 1904 St. Louis	Fencing	Men's foil
Bronze	Charles Tatham	(United States) 1904 St. Louis	Fencing	Men's foil
Bronze	Albertson Van Zo Post	(United States) 1904 St. Louis	Fencing	Men's épée
Bronze	Albertson Van Zo Post	(United States) 1904 St. Louis	Fencing	Men's sabre
Silver	Carlos de Cárdenas	(United Kingdom) 1948 London	Sailing	Men's star class
Silver	Enrique Figuerola	(Japan) 1964 Tokyo	Athletics	Men's 100 metres
Silver	Enrique Figuerola; Pablo Montes; Juan Morales; Hermes Ramirez	1968 Mexico City	Athletics	Men's 4 × 100 metre relay
Silver	Miguelina Cobián; Marlene Elejarde; Violetta Quesada; Fulgencia Romay	1968 Mexico City	Athletics	Women's 4 × 100 metre relay
Silver	Rolando Garbey	1968 Mexico City	Boxing	Men's light middleweight
Silver	Enrique Regüeiferos	1968 Mexico City	Boxing	Men's light welterweight
Gold	Orlando Martínez	(Germany) 1972 Munich	Boxing	Men's bantamweight
Gold	Emilio Correa	(Germany) 1972 Munich	Boxing	Men's welterweight
Gold	Teófilo Stevenson	(Germany) 1972 Munich	Boxing	Men's heavyweight
Silver	Gilberto Carrillo	(Germany) 1972 Munich	Boxing	Men's light heavyweight
Bronze	Silvia Chivás	(Germany) 1972 Munich	Athletics	Women's 100 metres
Bronze	Silvia Chivás; Marlene Elejarde; Fulgencia Romay; Carmen Valdés	(Germany) 1972 Munich	Athletics	Women's 4 × 100 metre relay
Bronze	Men's basketball team	(Germany) 1972 Munich	Basketball	Men's team
Bronze	Douglas Rodríguez	(Germany) 1972 Munich	Boxing	Men's flyweight
Gold	Alberto Juantorena	(Canada) 1976 Montreal	Athletics	Men's 400 metres
Gold	Alberto Juantorena	(Canada) 1976 Montreal	Athletics	Men's 800 metres
Gold	Ángel Herrera	(Canada) 1976 Montreal	Boxing	Men's featherweight
Gold	Teófilo Stevenson	(Canada) 1976 Montreal	Boxing	Men's heavyweight
Gold	Jorge Hernández	(Canada) 1976 Montreal	Boxing	Men's light flyweight
Gold	Héctor Rodríguez	(Canada) 1976 Montreal	Judo	Men's lightweight
Silver	Alejandro Casañas	(Canada) 1976 Montreal	Athletics	Men's 110m hurdles
Silver	Ramón Duvalón	(Canada) 1976 Montreal	Boxing	Men's flyweight
Silver	Sixto Soria	(Canada) 1976 Montreal	Boxing	Men's light heavy weight
Silver	Andrés Aldama	(Canada) 1976 Montreal	Boxing	Men's light welterweight
Bronze	Rolando Garbey	(Canada) 1976 Montreal	Boxing	Men's light middleweight
Bronze	Luis Martínez	(Canada) 1976 Montreal	Boxing	Men's middleweight
Bronze	Men's volleyball team	(Canada) 1976 Montreal	Volleyball	Men's team competition
Gold	María Caridad Colón	(Soviet Union) 1980 Moscow	Athletics	Women's javelin throw
Gold	Juan Hernández	(Soviet Union) 1980 Moscow	Boxing	Men's bantamweight
Gold	Teófilo Stevenson	(Soviet Union) 1980 Moscow	Boxing	Men's heavyweight
Gold	Armando Martínez	(Soviet Union) 1980 Moscow	Boxing	Men's light middleweight
Gold	Ángel Herrera	(Soviet Union) 1980 Moscow	Boxing	Men's lightweight
Gold	José Gómez Mustelier	(Soviet Union) 1980 Moscow	Boxing	Men's middleweight
Gold	Andrés Aldama	(Soviet Union) 1980 Moscow	Boxing	Men's welterweight
Gold	Daniel Núñez	(Soviet Union) 1980 Moscow	Weightlifting	Men's bantamweight (-56 kg)
Silver	Silvio Leonard	(Soviet Union) 1980 Moscow	Athletics	Men's 100 metres
Silver	Alejandro Casañas	(Soviet Union) 1980 Moscow	Athletics	Men's 110 metres
Silver	Adolfo Horta	(Soviet Union) 1980 Moscow	Boxing	Men's featherweight
Silver	Hipólito Ramos	(Soviet Union) 1980 Moscow	Boxing	Men's light flyweight
Silver	Jose Rodríguez	(Soviet Union) 1980 Moscow	Judo	Men's extra lightweight (60 kg)
Silver	Juan Ferrer	(Soviet Union) 1980 Moscow	Judo	Men's half middleweight (78 kg)
Silver	Isaac Azcuy	(Soviet Union) 1980 Moscow	Judo	Men's middleweight (86 kg)
Bronze	Luis Delis	(Soviet Union) 1980 Moscow	Athletics	Men's discus throw
Bronze	Ricardo Rojas	(Soviet Union) 1980 Moscow	Judo	Men's light heavyweight
Bronze	José Aguilar	(Soviet Union) 1980 Moscow	Boxing	Men's light welterweight
Bronze	Roberto Castrillo	(Soviet Union) 1980 Moscow	Shooting	Men's skeet shooting
Bronze	Alberto Blanco	(Soviet Union) 1980 Moscow	Weightlifting	Men's 100 kg
Gold	Javier Sotomayor	(Spain) 1992 Barcelona	Athletics	Men's high jump
Gold	Maritza Martén	(Spain) 1992 Barcelona	Athletics	Women's discus throw
Gold	Cuba national baseball team	(Spain) 1992 Barcelona	Baseball	Baseball
Gold	Joel Casamayor	(Spain) 1992 Barcelona	Boxing	Men's bantamweight
Gold	Félix Savón	(Spain) 1992 Barcelona	Boxing	Men's heavyweight
Gold	Rogelio Marcelo	(Spain) 1992 Barcelona	Boxing	Men's light flyweight
Gold	Juan Carlos Lemus	(Spain) 1992 Barcelona	Boxing	Men's light middleweight
Gold	Héctor Vinent	(Spain) 1992 Barcelona	Boxing	Men's light welterweight
Gold	Ariel Hernández	(Spain) 1992 Barcelona	Boxing	Men's middleweight
Gold	Roberto Balado	(Spain) 1992 Barcelona	Boxing	Men's super heavyweight
Gold	Odalis Revé	(Spain) 1992 Barcelona	Judo	Women's middleweight (66 kg)
Gold	Women's volleyball team	(Spain) 1992 Barcelona	Volleyball	Women's team competition
Gold	Héctor Milián	(Spain) 1992 Barcelona	Wrestling (Greco-Roman)	Men's Greco-Roman light heavyweight
Gold	Alejandro Puerto	(Spain) 1992 Barcelona	Wrestling (Freestyle)	Men's freestyle bantamweight (57 kg)
Silver	Roberto Hernández; Héctor Herrera; Lázaro Martínez; Norberto Téllez	(Spain) 1992 Barcelona	Athletics	Men's 4 × 400 metre relay
Silver	Raúl González	(Spain) 1992 Barcelona	Boxing	Men's flyweight
Silver	Juan Hernández	(Spain) 1992 Barcelona	Boxing	Men's welterweight
Silver	Guillermo Betancourt; Tulio Díaz; Hermenegildo García; Oscar García; Elvis Gregory	(Spain) 1992 Barcelona	Fencing	Men's foil team
Silver	Estela Rodríguez	(Spain) 1992 Barcelona	Judo	Women's heavyweight
Silver	Pablo Lara	(Spain) 1992 Barcelona	Weightlifting	Men's middleweight (75 kg)
Bronze	Jorge Aguilera; Joel Isasi; Joel Lamela; Andrés Simón	(Spain) 1992 Barcelona	Athletics	Men's 4 × 100 metre relay
Bronze	Roberto Moya	(Spain) 1992 Barcelona	Athletics	Men's discus throw
Bronze	Ana Fidelia Quirot	(Spain) 1992 Barcelona	Athletics	Women's 800 metres
Bronze	Ioamnet Quintero	(Spain) 1992 Barcelona	Athletics	Women's high jump
Bronze	Elvis Gregory	(Spain) 1992 Barcelona	Fencing	Men's foil
Bronze	Israel Hernández	(Spain) 1992 Barcelona	Judo	Men's half lightweight (65 kg)
Bronze	Amarilis Savón	(Spain) 1992 Barcelona	Judo	Women's extra lightweight (48 kg)
Bronze	Driulis González	(Spain) 1992 Barcelona	Judo	Women's lightweight (56 kg)
Bronze	Wilber Sánchez	(Spain) 1992 Barcelona	Wrestling (Greco-Roman)	Men's Greco-Roman light flyweight
Bronze	Juan Marén	(Spain) 1992 Barcelona	Wrestling (Greco-Roman)	Men's Greco-Roman featherweight
Bronze	Lázaro Reinoso	(Spain) 1992 Barcelona	Wrestling (Freestyle)	Men's freestyle featherweight (62 kg)
Gold	Cuba national baseball team	(United States) 1996 Atlanta	Baseball	Baseball
Gold	Maikro Romero	(United States) 1996 Atlanta	Boxing	Men's flyweight
Gold	Félix Savón	(United States) 1996 Atlanta	Boxing	Men's heavyweight
Gold	Héctor Vinent	(United States) 1996 Atlanta	Boxing	Men's light welterweight
Gold	Ariel Hernández	(United States) 1996 Atlanta	Boxing	Men's middleweight
Gold	Driulis González	(United States) 1996 Atlanta	Judo	Women's lightweight (56 kg)
Gold	Women's volleyball team	(United States) 1996 Atlanta	Volleyball	Women's team competition
Gold	Pablo Lara	(United States) 1996 Atlanta	Weightlifting	Men's middleweight (76 kg)
Gold	Filiberto Azcuy	(United States) 1996 Atlanta	Wrestling (Greco-Roman)	Men's Greco-Roman welterweight (74 kg)
Silver	Ana Fidelia Quirot	(United States) 1996 Atlanta	Athletics	Women's 800 metres
Silver	Arnaldo Mesa	(United States) 1996 Atlanta	Boxing	Men's bantamweight
Silver	Alfredo Duvergel	(United States) 1996 Atlanta	Boxing	Men's middleweight
Silver	Juan Hernández Sierra	(United States) 1996 Atlanta	Boxing	Men's welterweight
Silver	Iván Trevejo	(United States) 1996 Atlanta	Fencing	Men's épée
Silver	Estela Rodríguez	(United States) 1996 Atlanta	Judo	Women's heavyweight
Silver	Rodolfo Falcón	(United States) 1996 Atlanta	Swimming	Men's 100m backstroke
Silver	Juan Marén	(United States) 1996 Atlanta	Wrestling (Greco-Roman)	Men's Greco-Roman featherweight (62 kg)
Bronze	Yoelbi Quesada	(United States) 1996 Atlanta	Athletics	Men's triple jump
Bronze	Oscar García; Elvis Gregory; Rolando Tucker	(United States) 1996 Atlanta	Fencing	Men's foil team
Bronze	Israel Hernández	(United States) 1996 Atlanta	Judo	Men's half lightweight (65 kg)
Bronze	Amarilis Savón	(United States) 1996 Atlanta	Judo	Women's extra lightweight (48 kg)
Bronze	Legna Verdecia	(United States) 1996 Atlanta	Judo	Women's half lightweight (52 kg)
Bronze	Diadenis Luna	(United States) 1996 Atlanta	Judo	Women's half heavyweight (72 kg)
Bronze	Neisser Bent	(United States) 1996 Atlanta	Swimming	Men's 100m backstroke
Bronze	Alexis Vila	(United States) 1996 Atlanta	Wrestling (Freestyle)	Men's freestyle paperweight (48 kg)
Gold	Anier García	(Australia) 2000 Sydney	Athletics	Men's 110m hurdles
Gold	Iván Pedroso	(Australia) 2000 Sydney	Athletics	Men's long jump
Gold	Guillermo Rigondeaux	(Australia) 2000 Sydney	Boxing	Men's bantamweight
Gold	Félix Savón	(Australia) 2000 Sydney	Boxing	Men's heavyweight
Gold	Mario Kindelán	(Australia) 2000 Sydney	Boxing	Men's lightweight
Gold	Jorge Gutiérrez	(Australia) 2000 Sydney	Boxing	Men's middleweight
Gold	Legna Verdecia	(Australia) 2000 Sydney	Judo	Women's 52 kg
Gold	Sibelis Veranes	(Australia) 2000 Sydney	Judo	Women's 70 kg
Gold	Ángel Matos	(Australia) 2000 Sydney	Taekwondo	Men's 80 kg
Gold	Women's volleyball team	(Australia) 2000 Sydney	Volleyball	Women's team competition
Gold	Filiberto Azcuy	(Australia) 2000 Sydney	Wrestling (Greco-Roman)	Men's Greco-Roman
Silver	Javier Sotomayor	(Australia) 2000 Sydney	Athletics	Men's high jump
Silver	Cuba national baseball team	(Australia) 2000 Sydney	Baseball	Baseball
Silver	Ledis Balceiro	(Australia) 2000 Sydney	Canoeing	Men's C-1 1000m
Silver	Leobaldo Pereira; Ibrahim Rojas	(Australia) 2000 Sydney	Canoeing	Men's C-2 1000m
Silver	Driulis González	(Australia) 2000 Sydney	Judo	Women's 57 kg
Silver	Daima Beltrán	(Australia) 2000 Sydney	Judo	Women's +78 kg
Silver	Urbia Melendez	(Australia) 2000 Sydney	Taekwondo	Women's 49 kg
Silver	Yoel Romero	(Australia) 2000 Sydney	Wrestling (Freestyle)	Men's freestyle 85 kg
Silver	Lázaro Rivas	(Australia) 2000 Sydney	Wrestling (Greco-Roman)	Men's Greco-Roman 54 kg
Silver	Juan Marén	(Australia) 2000 Sydney	Wrestling (Greco-Roman)	Men's Greco-Roman 63 kg
Bronze	José Ángel César; Iván García; Freddy Mayola; Luis Alberto Pérez-Rionda	(Australia) 2000 Sydney	Athletics	Men's 4 × 100 m
Bronze	Osleidys Menéndez	(Australia) 2000 Sydney	Athletics	Women's javelin throw
Bronze	Maikro Romero	(Australia) 2000 Sydney	Boxing	Men's light flyweight
Bronze	Diógenes Luña	(Australia) 2000 Sydney	Boxing	Men's light welterweight
Bronze	Nelson Loyola; Carlos Pedroso; Iván Trevejo	(Australia) 2000 Sydney	Fencing	Men's team épée
Bronze	Manolo Poulot	(Australia) 2000 Sydney	Judo	Men's 60 kg
Bronze	Alexis Rodríguez	(Australia) 2000 Sydney	Wrestling (Freestyle)	Men's freestyle 130 kg
Gold	Osleidys Menéndez	(Greece) 2004 Athens	Athletics	Women's javelin throw
Gold	Yumileidi Cumbá	(Greece) 2004 Athens	Athletics	Women's shot put
Gold	Cuba national baseball team	(Greece) 2004 Athens	Baseball	Baseball
Gold	Guillermo Rigondeaux	(Greece) 2004 Athens	Boxing	Men's bantamweight
Gold	Yuriorkis Gamboa	(Greece) 2004 Athens	Boxing	Men's flyweight
Gold	Odlanier Solís	(Greece) 2004 Athens	Boxing	Men's heavyweight
Gold	Yan Bartelemí	(Greece) 2004 Athens	Boxing	Men's light flyweight
Gold	Mario Kindelan	(Greece) 2004 Athens	Boxing	Men's lightweight
Gold	Yandro Miguel Quintana	(Greece) 2004 Athens	Wrestling (Freestyle)	Men's 55–60 kg
Silver	Yipsi Moreno	(Greece) 2004 Athens	Athletics	Women's hammer throw
Silver	Yudel Johnson Cedeno	(Greece) 2004 Athens	Boxing	Men's 60–64 kg
Silver	Lorenzo Aragon	(Greece) 2004 Athens	Boxing	Men's 64–69 kg
Silver	Ledis Balceiro; Ibrahim Rojas	(Greece) 2004 Athens	Canoeing	Men's C-2 500m
Silver	Daima Beltran	(Greece) 2004 Athens	Judo	Women's heavyweight
Silver	Yanelis Labrada	(Greece) 2004 Athens	Taekwondo	Women's -49 kg
Silver	Roberto Monzon	(Greece) 2004 Athens	Wrestling (Greco-Roman)	Men's 55–60 kg
Bronze	Cuba national volleyball team	(Greece) 2004 Athens	Volleyball	Women's competition
Bronze	Anier García	(Greece) 2004 Athens	Athletics	Men's 110m hurdles
Bronze	Yunaika Crawford	(Greece) 2004 Athens	Athletics	Women's hammer throw
Bronze	Michel Lopez Nunez	(Greece) 2004 Athens	Boxing	Men's super heavyweight
Bronze	Yordanis Arencibia	(Greece) 2004 Athens	Judo	Men's half-lightweight
Bronze	Yurisel Laborde	(Greece) 2004 Athens	Judo	Women's half-heavyweight
Bronze	Amarilis Savón	(Greece) 2004 Athens	Judo	Women's half-lightweight
Bronze	Driulys González	(Greece) 2004 Athens	Judo	Women's half-middleweight
Bronze	Yurisleidy Lupetey	(Greece) 2004 Athens	Judo	Women's lightweight
Bronze	Juan Miguel Rodríguez	(Greece) 2004 Athens	Shooting	Men's skeet (125 targets)
Bronze	Iván Fundora	(Greece) 2004 Athens	Wrestling (Freestyle)	Men's 66–74 kg
Gold	Dayron Robles	(China) 2008 Beijing	Athletics	Men's 110m hurdles
Gold	Mijain López	(China) 2008 Beijing	Wrestling (Greco-Roman)	Men's 120 kg
Gold	Yipsi Moreno	(China) 2008 Beijing	Athletics	Women's hammer throw
Silver	Cuba national baseball team	(China) 2008 Beijing	Baseball	Baseball
Silver	Yankiel León	(China) 2008 Beijing	Boxing	Men's Bantamweight
Silver	Andry Laffita	(China) 2008 Beijing	Boxing	Men's flyweight
Silver	Emilio Correa	(China) 2008 Beijing	Boxing	Men's middleweight
Silver	Carlos Banteux	(China) 2008 Beijing	Boxing	Men's welterweight
Silver	Yoanka González	(China) 2008 Beijing	Cycling (Track)	Women's points race
Silver	Yanet Bermoy	(China) 2008 Beijing	Judo	Women's -48 kg
Silver	Anaysi Hernández	(China) 2008 Beijing	Judo	Women's -70 kg
Silver	Yalennis Castillo	(China) 2008 Beijing	Judo	Women's -78 kg
Bronze	Ibrahim Camejo	(China) 2008 Beijing	Athletics	Men's long jump
Bronze	Leonel Suárez	(China) 2008 Beijing	Athletics	Men's decathlon
Bronze	Yampier Hernández	(China) 2008 Beijing	Boxing	Men's light flyweight
Bronze	Yordenis Ugás	(China) 2008 Beijing	Boxing	Men's lightweight
Bronze	Osmai Acosta Duarte	(China) 2008 Beijing	Boxing	Men's heavyweight
Bronze	Roniel Iglesias	(China) 2008 Beijing	Boxing	Men's light welterweight
Bronze	Yordanis Arencibia	(China) 2008 Beijing	Judo	Men's -66 kg
Bronze	Óscar Brayson	(China) 2008 Beijing	Judo	Men's +100 kg
Bronze	Idalys Ortiz	(China) 2008 Beijing	Judo	Women's +78 kg
Bronze	Eglis Yaima Cruz	(China) 2008 Beijing	Shooting	Women's 50m rifle 3 positions
Bronze	Daynellis Montejo	(China) 2008 Beijing	Taekwondo	Women's 49 kg
Bronze	Yordanis Borrero	(China) 2008 Beijing	Weightlifting	Men's 69 kg
Bronze	Jadier Valladares	(China) 2008 Beijing	Weightlifting	Men's 85 kg
Bronze	Yoandry Hernández	(China) 2008 Beijing	Weightlifting	Men's 94 kg
Gold	Robeisy Ramírez	(United Kingdom) 2012 London	Boxing	Men's flyweight
Gold	Roniel Iglesias	(United Kingdom) 2012 London	Boxing	Men's lightweight
Gold	Idalys Ortiz	(United Kingdom) 2012 London	Judo	Women's +78 kg
Gold	Leuris Pupo	(United Kingdom) 2012 London	Shooting	Men's 25m rapid fire pistol
Gold	Mijain López	(United Kingdom) 2012 London	Wrestling (Greco-Roman)	Men's 120 kg
Silver	Yarisley Silva	(United Kingdom) 2012 London	Athletics	Women's pole vault
Silver	Asley González	(United Kingdom) 2012 London	Judo	Men's -90 kg
Silver	Yanet Bermoy	(United Kingdom) 2012 London	Judo	Women's -52 kg
Bronze	Leonel Suárez	(United Kingdom) 2012 London	Athletics	Men's decathlon
Bronze	Lázaro Álvarez	(United Kingdom) 2012 London	Boxing	Men's bantamweight
Bronze	Yasniel Toledo	(United Kingdom) 2012 London	Boxing	Men's lightweight
Bronze	Robelis Despaigne	(United Kingdom) 2012 London	Taekwondo	Men's +80 kg
Bronze	Iván Cambar	(United Kingdom) 2012 London	Weightlifting	Men's 77 kg
Bronze	Liván López	(United Kingdom) 2012 London	Wrestling (Freestyle)	Men's 66 kg freestyle
Gold	Robeisy Ramírez	(Brazil) 2016 Rio de Janeiro	Boxing	Men's bantamweight
Gold	Julio César La Cruz	(Brazil) 2016 Rio de Janeiro	Boxing	Men's light heavyweight
Gold	Arlen López	(Brazil) 2016 Rio de Janeiro	Boxing	Men's middleweight
Gold	Ismael Borrero	(Brazil) 2016 Rio de Janeiro	Wrestling (Greco-Roman)	Men's 59 kg
Gold	Mijaín López	(Brazil) 2016 Rio de Janeiro	Wrestling (Greco-Roman)	Men's 130 kg
Silver	Idalys Ortiz	(Brazil) 2016 Rio de Janeiro	Judo	Women's +78 kg
Silver	Yasmany Lugo	(Brazil) 2016 Rio de Janeiro	Wrestling (Greco-Roman)	Men's 98 kg
Bronze	Denia Caballero	(Brazil) 2016 Rio de Janeiro	Athletics	Women's discus throw
Bronze	Joahnys Argilagos	(Brazil) 2016 Rio de Janeiro	Boxing	Men's light flyweight
Bronze	Lázaro Álvarez	(Brazil) 2016 Rio de Janeiro	Boxing	Men's lightweight
Bronze	Erislandy Savón	(Brazil) 2016 Rio de Janeiro	Boxing	Men's heavyweight
Gold	Luis Orta	(Japan) 2020 Tokyo	Wrestling	Men's Greco-Roman 60 kg
Gold	Mijaín López	(Japan) 2020 Tokyo	Wrestling	Men's Greco-Roman 130 kg
Gold	Fernando Jorge; Serguey Torres	(Japan) 2020 Tokyo	Canoeing	Men's C-2 1000 metres
Gold	Roniel Iglesias	(Japan) 2020 Tokyo	Boxing	Men's welterweight
Gold	Arlen López	(Japan) 2020 Tokyo	Boxing	Men's light heavyweight
Gold	Julio César La Cruz	(Japan) 2020 Tokyo	Boxing	Men's heavyweight
Gold	Andy Cruz	(Japan) 2020 Tokyo	Boxing	Men's lightweight
Silver	Idalys Ortiz	(Japan) 2020 Tokyo	Judo	Women's +78 kg
Silver	Juan Miguel Echevarría	(Japan) 2020 Tokyo	Athletics	Men's long jump
Silver	Leuris Pupo	(Japan) 2020 Tokyo	Shooting	Men's 25 metre rapid fire pistol
Bronze	Rafael Alba	(Japan) 2020 Tokyo	Taekwondo	Men's +80 kg
Bronze	Maykel Massó	(Japan) 2020 Tokyo	Athletics	Men's long jump
Bronze	Yaime Pérez	(Japan) 2020 Tokyo	Athletics	Women's discus throw
Bronze	Lázaro Álvarez	(Japan) 2020 Tokyo	Boxing	Men's featherweight
Bronze	Reineris Salas	(Japan) 2020 Tokyo	Wrestling	Men's freestyle 97 kg
