= Cuba at the 1904 Summer Olympics =

- IOC code: CUB
- NOC: Cuban Olympic Committee

in St. Louis
- Competitors: 3 in 2 sports
- Medals Ranked 3rd: Gold 3 Silver 0 Bronze 0 Total 3

Summer Olympics appearances (overview)
- 1900; 1904; 1908–1920; 1924; 1928; 1932–1936; 1948; 1952; 1956; 1960; 1964; 1968; 1972; 1976; 1980; 1984–1988; 1992; 1996; 2000; 2004; 2008; 2012; 2016; 2020; 2024; 2028

Cuba competed at the 1904 Summer Olympics in St. Louis, United States.

== Medalists ==
| Medal | Name | Sport | Event | Date |
|---|---|---|---|---|
| Gold | Ramón Fonst | Fencing | Men's épée | September 7 |
| Gold | Ramón Fonst | Fencing | Men's foil | September 7 |
| Gold | Manuel Díaz | Fencing | Men's sabre | September 8 |

Medals that the IOC attributes to the United States, but until 2021 erroneously attributed to Cuba.

| Medal | Name | Sport | Event | Date |
|---|---|---|---|---|
| Gold | Albertson Van Zo Post | Fencing | Men's singlestick | September 8 |
| Silver | Charles Tatham | Fencing | Men's épée | September 7 |
| Silver | Albertson Van Zo Post | Fencing | Men's foil | September 7 |
| Bronze | Charles Tatham | Fencing | Men's foil | September 7 |
| Bronze | Albertson Van Zo Post | Fencing | Men's épée | September 7 |
| Bronze | Albertson Van Zo Post | Fencing | Men's sabre | September 8 |

== Results by event ==
=== Athletics ===
| Event | Place | Athlete | Final |
|---|---|---|---|
| Men's marathon | 4th | Andarín Carvajal | Unknown |

=== Fencing ===
| Event | Place | Fencer | Semifinal | Final |
|---|---|---|---|---|
| Men's foil | 1st | Ramón Fonst | 4-0; 1st, semifinal A | 3-0 |
| Men's foil | 2nd | Albertson Van Zo Post (USA) | 3-1; 2nd, semifinal A | 2-1 |
| Men's foil | 3rd | Charles Tatham (USA) | 2-1; 2nd, semifinal B | 1-2 |

| Event | Place | Fencer | Final |
|---|---|---|---|
| Men's team foil | 1st | Mixed team Ramón Fonst; Albertson Van Zo Post (USA); Manuel Díaz | 1-0 (7-2) |
| Men's épée | 1st | Ramón Fonst | Unknown |
| Men's épée | 2nd | Charles Tatham (USA) | Unknown |
| Men's épée | 3rd | Albertson Van Zo Post (USA) | Unknown |
| Men's sabre | 1st | Manuel Díaz | 3-0 |
| Men's sabre | 3rd | Albertson Van Zo Post (USA) | 2-1 |
| Men's singlestick | 1st | Albertson Van Zo Post (USA) | 11 |
