= Fencing at the 1904 Summer Olympics – Men's sabre =

Men's sabre at the Games of the III Olympiad
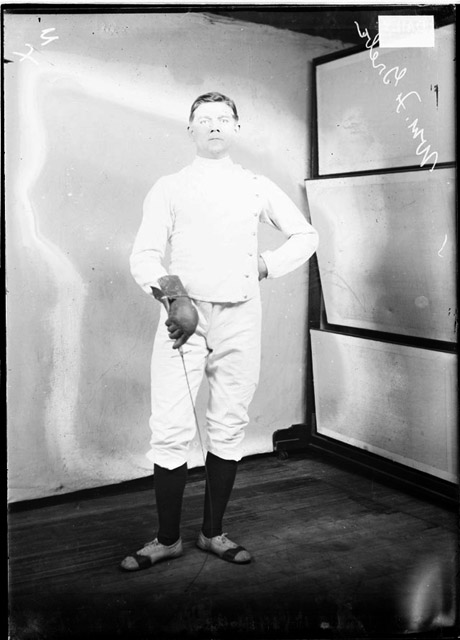
- Silver medalist William Grebe
- Venue: Francis Gymnasium, Washington University in St. Louis
- Date: September 8, 1904
- Competitors: 5 from 2 nations

Medalists
1st place, gold medalist(s)		Manuel Díaz	Cuba
2nd place, silver medalist(s)		William Grebe	United States
3rd place, bronze medalist(s)		Albertson Van Zo Post	United States

The men's sabre was a fencing event held as part of the fencing programme at the 1904 Summer Olympics. It was the third time the event was held at the Olympics. 5 fencers from 2 nations competed. The competition was held on Thursday, September 8, 1904. The event was won by Manuel Díaz of Cuba. American William Grebe took second. Albertson Van Zo Post, an American erroneously listed the IOC database as Cuban until 2021, earned bronze.

== Background ==
This was the third appearance of the event, which is the only fencing event to have been held at every Summer Olympics. Albertson Van Zo Post had been the U.S. champion for three years. Manuel Díaz was a Cuban fencer who had attended Harvard College.

Both Cuba and the United States made their debut in the men's sabre. None of the nations that had competed in 1896 or 1900 entered the 1904 sabre competition.

== Competition format ==
The event used a single pool-play final format. Standard sabre rules were used; unlike the previous two games, the target area was limited to above the waist. Bouts were to 7 touches.

== Schedule ==
Date	Time	Round
Thursday, 8 September 1904		Final

== Results ==
Rank	Fencer	Nation	Wins	Losses
1st place, gold medalist(s)	Manuel Díaz	Cuba	3	0
2nd place, silver medalist(s)	William Grebe	United States	2	1
3rd place, bronze medalist(s)	Albertson Van Zo Post	United States	2	1
4	Theodore Carstens	United States	1	2
5	Arthur Fox	United States	0	4

== Sources ==
- Wudarski, Pawel (1999). "Wyniki Igrzysk Olimpijskich" (in Polish). Archived from the original on 16 February 2009.
