= Mixed team at the 1904 Summer Olympics =

- IOC code: ZZX
- NOC: Mixed team
- Competitors: 3 in 1 sport
- Medals: Gold 1 Silver 0 Bronze 0 Total 1

Summer Olympics appearances (overview)
- 1896; 1900; 1904

Other related appearances
- 1906 Intercalated Games

Early Olympic Games allowed for individuals in a team to be from different nations. The International Olympic Committee (IOC) now groups their results together under the mixed team designation. Until 2024 IOC used code ZZX and since 2024 code XXB for designating mixed teams. During the 1904 Summer Olympics, team comprising international members won 1 medal. Until 2024 the IOC attributed to mixed teams 3 more medals, however, since 2024 these medals were reallocated to the particular countries.

== Medalists ==
Medal	Name	Sport	Event
Gold	Manuel Díaz (CUB); Ramón Fonst (CUB); Albertson Van Zo Post (USA)	Fencing	Team foil

== Medals, that IOC until 2024 attributed to mixed teams ==
Until 2024 the IOC also attributed to mixed teams the following 3 medals. Since 2024 the IOC has reallocated these medals to the particular countries.

Medal	Name	Sport	Event	Reallocated to
Gold	John Grieb (USA); Anton Heida (USA); Max Hess (USA); Philip Kassel (USA); Julius Lenhart (AUT); Ernst Reckeweg (USA)	Gymnastics	Artistic Team All-Around, Apparatus Work and Field Sports Men	United States
Silver	Albert Corey (FRA); Lacey Hearn (USA); Sidney Hatch (USA); James Lightbody (USA); Frank Verner (USA)	Athletics	4 mile team race	United States
Bronze	Oscar Friede (USA); Charles Harberkorn (USA); Harry Jacobs (USA); Frank Kugler (GER); Charles Thias (USA)	Tug of War	Men	United States
