= Cuba at the 2028 Summer Olympics =

- IOC code: CUB
- NOC: Cuban Olympic Committee

in Los Angeles, United States 14 July 2028 – 30 July 2028
- Competitors: 12 in 1 sport
- Medals: Gold 0 Silver 0 Bronze 0 Total 0

Summer Olympics appearances (overview)
- 1900; 1904; 1908–1920; 1924; 1928; 1932–1936; 1948; 1952; 1956; 1960; 1964; 1968; 1972; 1976; 1980; 1984–1988; 1992; 1996; 2000; 2004; 2008; 2012; 2016; 2020; 2024; 2028

Cuba is scheduled to compete at the 2028 Summer Olympics in Los Angeles, from 14 to 30 July 2028. It will be the nation's twenty-third appearance at the Summer Olympics.

== Competitors ==
The following is the list of number of competitors in the Games.

Sport	Men	Women	Total
Volleyball	12	0	12
Total	12	0	12

== Volleyball ==
Cuban team secured qualification berth in the mens event by claiming the direct North & Central American qualification at the 2026 Men's NORCECA Volleyball Championship in Moncton, Canada; marking the nation's return to the Olympic Games after last competing in 2016.

Team	Event	Group stage				Quarterfinal	Semifinal	Final / BM	
Team	Event	Opposition Score	Opposition Score	Opposition Score	Rank	Opposition Score	Opposition Score	Opposition Score	Rank
Cuba men's	Men's tournament								
