= Fencing at the 1904 Summer Olympics – Men's foil =

Men's foil at the Games of the III Olympiad
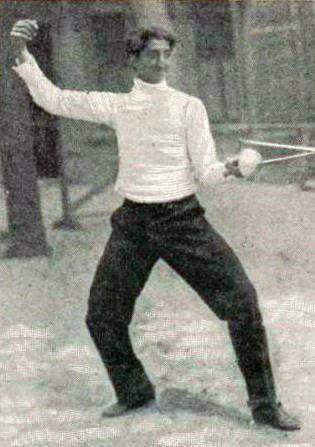
- Ramón Fonst
- Venue: Francis Gymnasium, Washington University in St. Louis
- Date: September 7, 1904
- Competitors: 9 from 3 nations

Medalists
1st place, gold medalist(s)		Ramón Fonst	Cuba
2nd place, silver medalist(s)		Albertson Van Zo Post	United States
3rd place, bronze medalist(s)		Charles Tatham	United States

The men's foil was a fencing event held as part of the fencing programme at the 1904 Summer Olympics. It was the third time the event was held at the Olympics. The competition was held on September 7, 1904. Nine fencers from three nations competed. The medals were swept by "Cuban" fencers; only Fonst was actually Cuban, but the other two men (Albertson Van Zo Post and Charles Tatham) were marked as Cuban by the IOC despite being American. The mistake was corrected after more than 100 years in the early 2020s.

== Background ==
This was the third appearance of the event, which has been held at every Summer Olympics except 1908 (when there was a foil display only rather than a medal event). None of the fencers from 1900 returned.

Two of the three competing nations were making their debut in the men's foil: Cuba and Germany. Only the United States had previously competed, in 1900; the United States' two appearances matched France (1896 and 1900).

== Competition format ==
The event used a two-round format (semifinals and a final). The semifinal consisted of two pools, one of five fencers and one of four fencers, with each pool playing a round-robin. The top two in each semifinal advanced to the final; these four played another round-robin. Standard foil rules were used, including that touches had to be made with the tip of the foil, the target area was limited to the torso, and priority determined the winner of double touches.

However, the number of touches made was not determinative of the winner of a bout. Instead, each bout was evaluated by judges. Each judge assigned up to 100 points to each fencer, with the fencer having the higher average score winning the bout.

== Schedule ==
Date	Time	Round
Wednesday, 7 September 1904		Semifinals; Final

== Results ==
=== Semifinals ===
Each fencer in a group faced each other fencer in that group once. The top two fencers in each semifinal group moved on to the final.

==== Semifinal A ====
Rank	Fencer	Nation	Wins	Losses	Notes
1	Ramón Fonst	Cuba	4	0	Q
2	Albertson Van Zo Post	United States	3	1	Q
3	Fitzhugh Townsend	United States	2	2	
4	Theodore Carstens	United States	1	3	
5	William Grebe	United States	0	4	

==== Semifinal B ====
Rank	Fencer	Nation	Wins	Losses	Notes
1	Gustav Casmir	Germany	3	0	Q
2	Charles Tatham	United States	2	1	Q
3	Wilfred Holroyd	United States	1	2	
4	Arthur Fox	United States	0	3	

=== Final ===
Fonst continued to defeat all comers, including Post a second time, to win the gold. Post's only two losses in the event came against Fonst, as he took silver. Tatham, who had lost to Casmir in the semifinal pool, defeated him the second time around to take third place.

Rank	Fencer	Nation	Wins	Losses
1st place, gold medalist(s)	Ramón Fonst	Cuba	3	0
2nd place, silver medalist(s)	Albertson Van Zo Post	United States	2	1
3rd place, bronze medalist(s)	Charles Tatham	United States	1	2
4	Gustav Casmir	Germany	0	3

== Final classification ==
Rank	Fencer	Nation	Notes
1st place, gold medalist(s)	Ramón Fonst	Cuba	Final
2nd place, silver medalist(s)	Albertson Van Zo Post	United States	Final
3rd place, bronze medalist(s)	Charles Tatham	United States	Final
4	Gustav Casmir	Germany	Final
5	Fitzhugh Townsend	United States	3rd in semifinal pool
5	Wilfred Holroyd	United States	3rd in semifinal pool
7	Theodore Carstens	United States	4th in semifinal pool
7	Arthur Fox	United States	4th in semifinal pool
9	William Grebe	United States	5th in semifinal pool

== Sources ==
- Wudarski, Pawel (1999). "Wyniki Igrzysk Olimpijskich" (in Polish). Archived from the original on 16 February 2009.
