= Fencing at the 1904 Summer Olympics – Men's team foil =

Men's team foil at the Games of the III Olympiad
- Venue: Francis Gymnasium, Washington University in St. Louis
- Date: September 7, 1904
- Competitors: 6 from 2 nations

Medalists
1st place, gold medalist(s)		Manuel Díaz; Ramón Fonst; Albertson Van Zo Post; Mixed team
2nd place, silver medalist(s)		Arthur Fox; Charles Tatham; Fitzhugh Townsend; United States

The men's team foil was a fencing event held as part of the fencing programme at the 1904 Summer Olympics. It was the first time a team fencing event was held at the Olympics. 2 teams of 3 fencers each competed.

== Results ==
=== Final ===
Each of the three fencers on each team faced all three of the other team's fencers. The mixed team won 7 of the 9 individual bouts, giving them the team victory.

Final
1st place, gold medalist(s)	Mixed team Ramón Fonst (CUB); Albertson Van Zo Post (USA); Manuel Díaz (CUB)	1 (7)	0 (2)
2nd place, silver medalist(s)	United States; Charles Tatham; Fitzhugh Townsend; Arthur Fox	0 (2)	1 (7)
