= List of Olympic venues in fencing =

For the Summer Olympics, there are 31 venues that have been or will be used for fencing.

Games	Venue	Other sports hosted at venue for those games	Capacity	Ref.
1896 Athens	Zappeion	None	Not listed.	
1900 Paris	Tuileries Garden	None	Not listed.	
1904 St. Louis	Francis Gymnasium	Boxing	Not listed.	
1908 London	Franco-British Exhibition Fencing Grounds	None	Not listed.	
1912 Stockholm	Östermalm Athletic Grounds	Equestrian, Modern pentathlon (fencing), Tennis	Not listed.	
1920 Antwerp	Gardens de la Palace d'Egmont	None	Not listed.	
1924 Paris	Stade de Colombes	Athletics, Cycling (road), Equestrian, Football (final), Gymnastics, Modern pentathlon (fencing, running), Rugby union, Tennis	22,737	
1928 Amsterdam	Schermzaal	Modern pentathlon (fencing)	559	
1932 Los Angeles	160th Regiment State Armory	Modern pentathlon (fencing)	1,800	
1936 Berlin	Haus des Deutschen Sports	Modern pentathlon (fencing)	1200	
1936 Berlin	Tennis Courts (épée)	Basketball	832.	
1948 London	Wembley Palace of Engineering	None	Not listed.	
1952 Helsinki	Westend Tennis Hall	None	Not listed.	
1956 Melbourne	St Kilda Town Hall	None	Not listed.	
1960 Rome	Palazzo dei Congressi	Modern pentathlon (fencing)	Not listed.	
1964 Tokyo	Waseda Memorial Hall	Modern pentathlon (fencing)	2,200	
1968 Mexico City	Fernando Montes de Oca Fencing Hall	Modern pentathlon (fencing)	3,000	
1972 Munich	Messegelände, Fechthalle 1 (final)	None	978	
1972 Munich	Messegelände Fechthalle 2	Modern pentathlon (fencing)	Same as Fechthalle 1.	
1976 Montreal	Winter Stadium, Université de Montréal	Modern pentathlon (fencing)	2,461	
1980 Moscow	CSKA Football Fieldhouse	Modern pentathlon (fencing)	8,500	
1984 Los Angeles	Long Beach Convention Center	None	2,500	
1988 Seoul	Olympic Fencing Gymnasium	Modern pentathlon (fencing)	7,000	
1992 Barcelona	Palau de la Metal·lúrgia	Modern pentathlon (fencing)	Not listed.	
1996 Atlanta	Georgia World Congress Center	Handball, Judo, Modern pentathlon (fencing, shooting), Table tennis, Weightlifting, Wrestling	3,900 (fencing); 7,300 (handball); 7,300 (judo); 4,700 (table tennis); 5,000 (weightlifting); 7,300 (wrestling)	
2000 Sydney	Sydney Convention and Exhibition Centre	Boxing, Judo, Weightlifting, Wrestling	7,500 (weightlifting), 9,000 (judo & wrestling), 10,000 (boxing & fencing)	
2004 Athens	Helliniko Fencing Hall	None	8,000	
2008 Beijing	Olympic Green Convention Center	Modern pentathlon (fencing, shooting)	5,695	
2012 London	ExCeL	Boxing, Judo, Table tennis, Taekwondo, Weightlifting, Wrestling	Not listed.	
2016 Rio de Janeiro	Carioca Arena 3	Taekwondo	10,000	
2020 Tokyo	Makuhari Messe	Taekwondo, Wrestling	6,000	
2024 Paris	Grand Palais	Taekwondo	8,000	
2028 Los Angeles	Los Angeles Convention Center	Basketball, Boxing, Cycling (BMX racing), Table tennis, Taekwondo	7,000	
2032 Brisbane	Brisbane Convention & Exhibition Centre	Badminton, Table tennis, Taekwondo	6,000	

== Gallery of venues ==
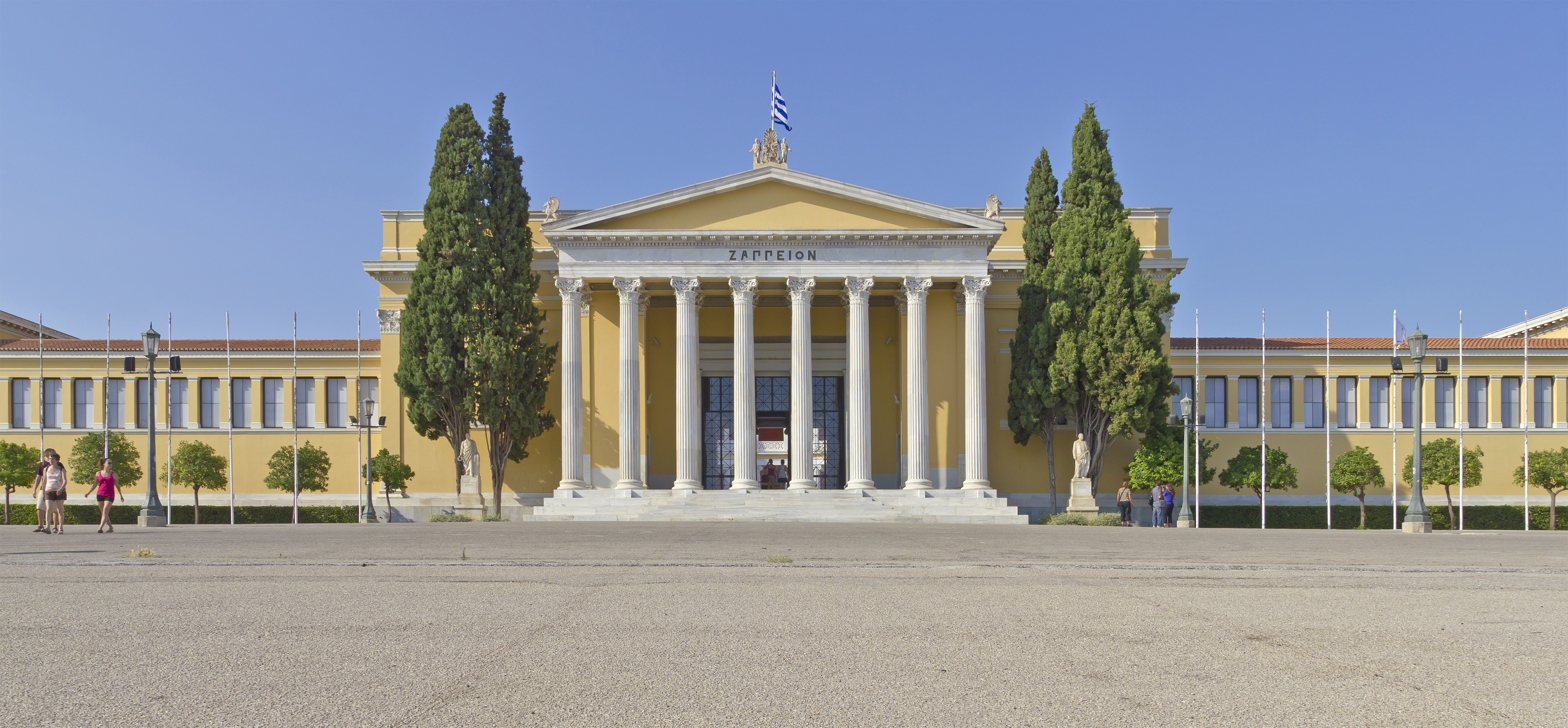
Zappeion hosted fencing at the 1896 Summer Olympics in Athens.

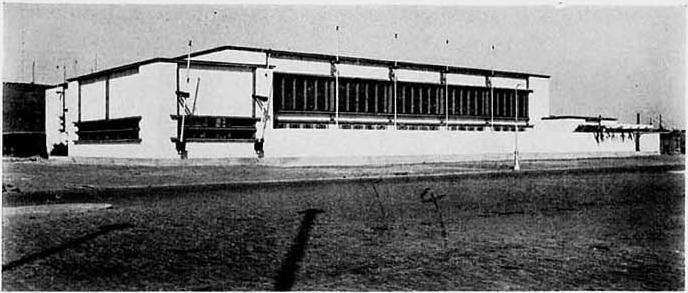
Schermzaal Fencing Hall hosted fencing at the 1928 Summer Olympics in Amsterdam.

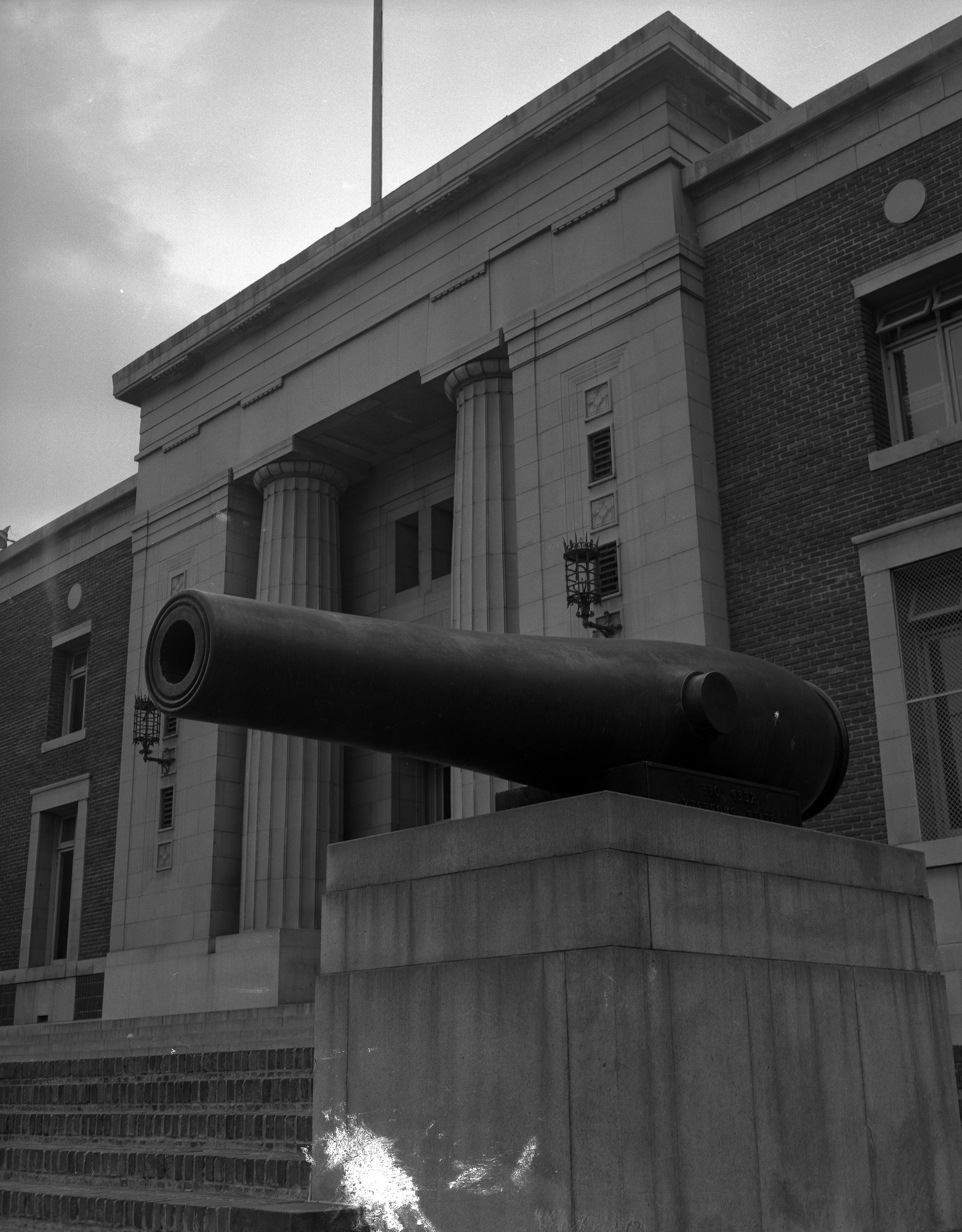
The Wallis Annenberg Building hosted fencing at the 1932 Summer Olympics in Los Angeles.

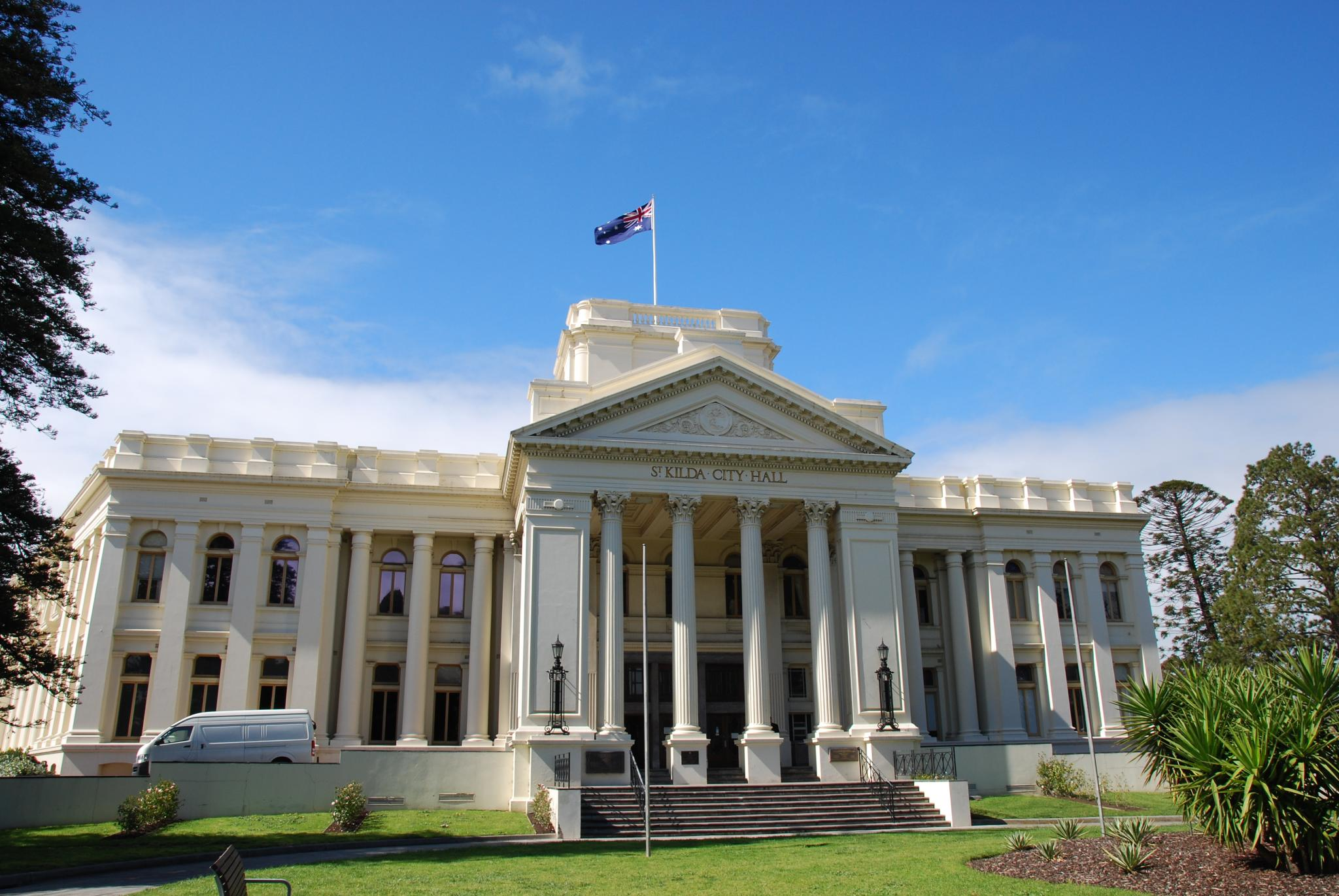
St Kilda Town Hall hosted fencing at the 1956 Summer Olympics in Melbourne.

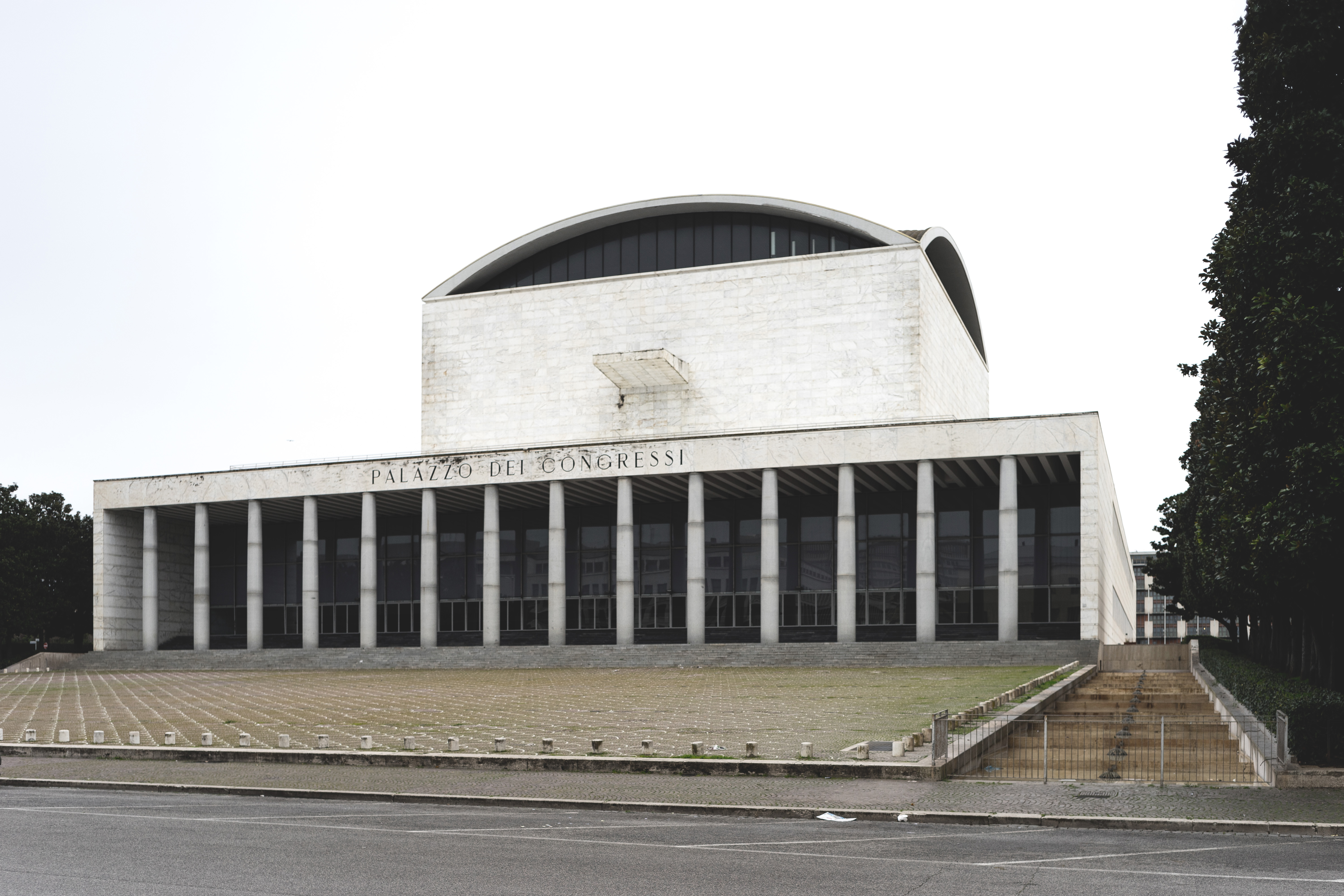
The Palazzo dei Congressi hosted fencing at the 1960 Summer Olympics in Rome.

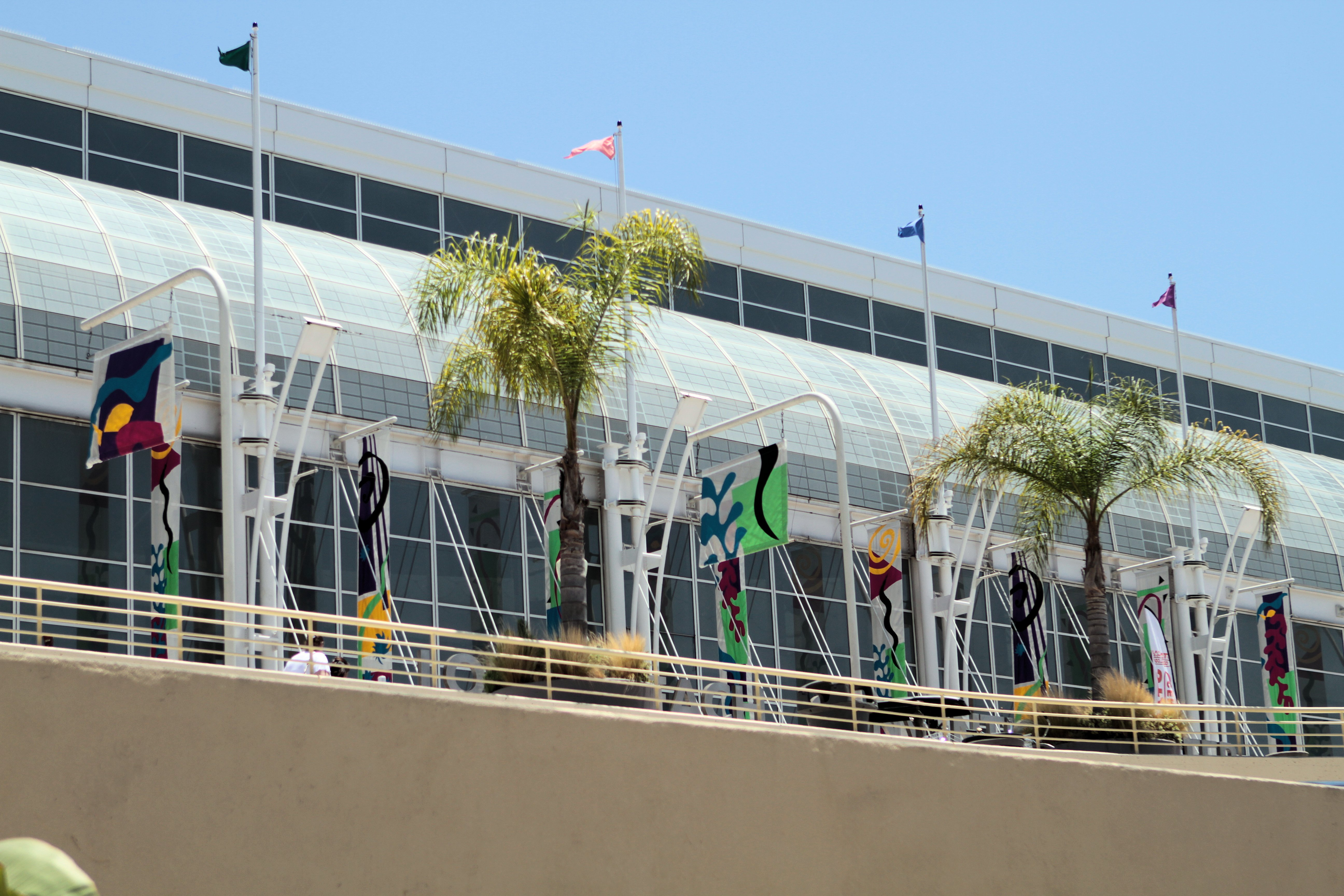
The Long Beach Convention Center hosted fencing at the 1984 Summer Olympics in Los Angeles.

Ticketlink Live Arena hosted fencing at the 1988 Summer Olympics in Seoul.

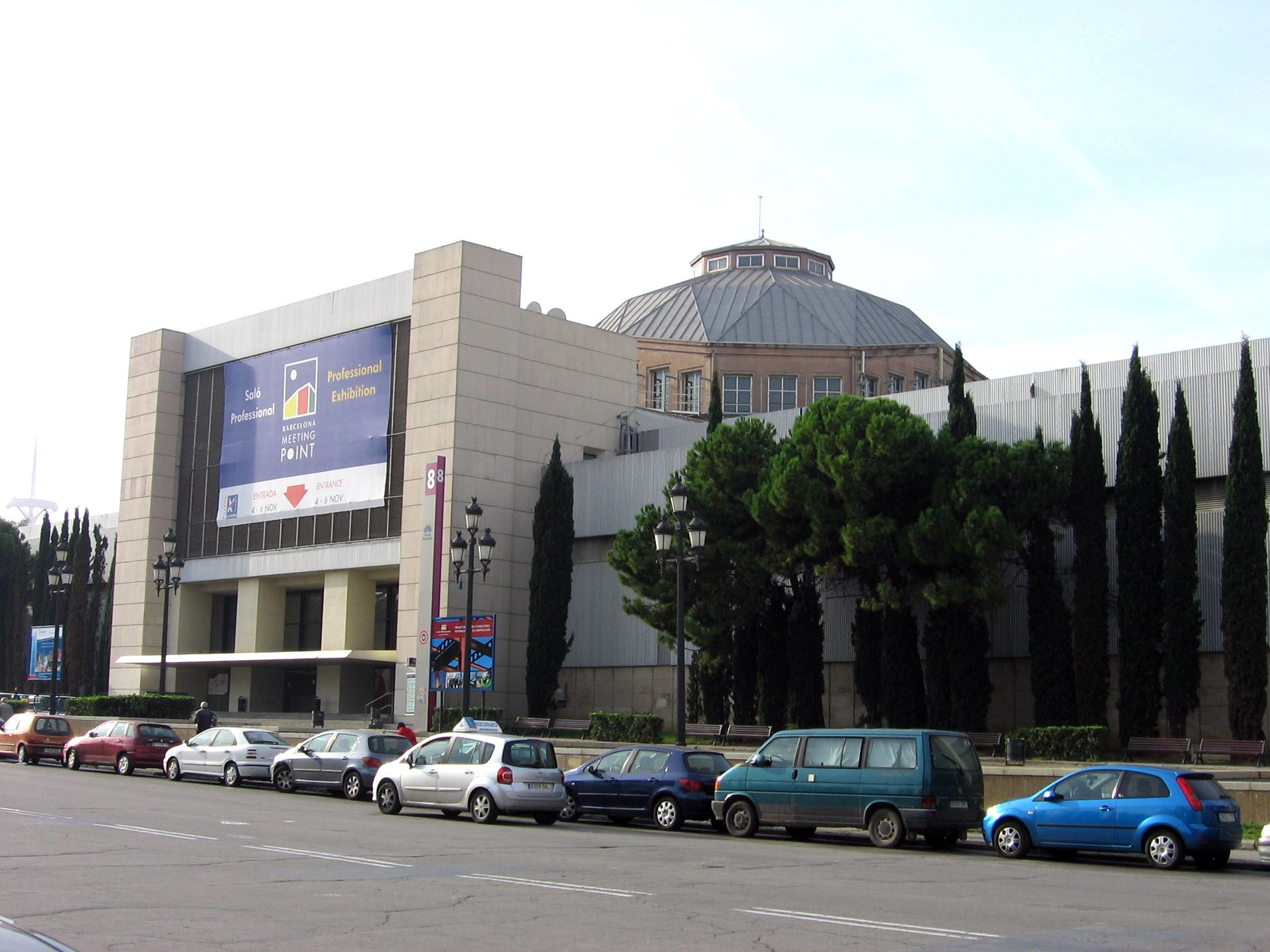
Palau de la Metal·lúrgia hosted fencing at the 1992 Summer Olympics in Barcelona.

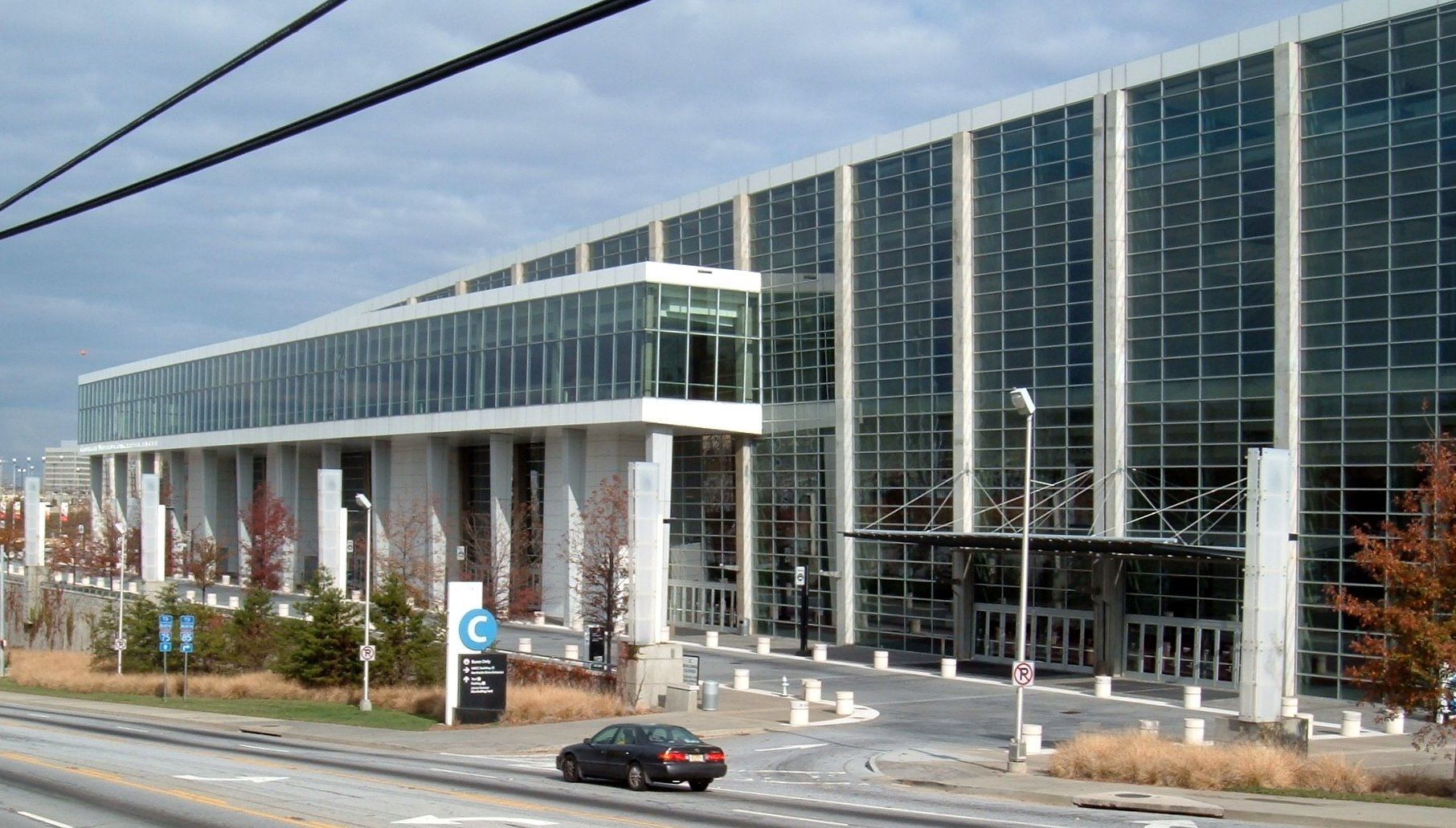
The Georgia World Congress Center hosted fencing at the 1996 Summer Olympics in Atlanta.

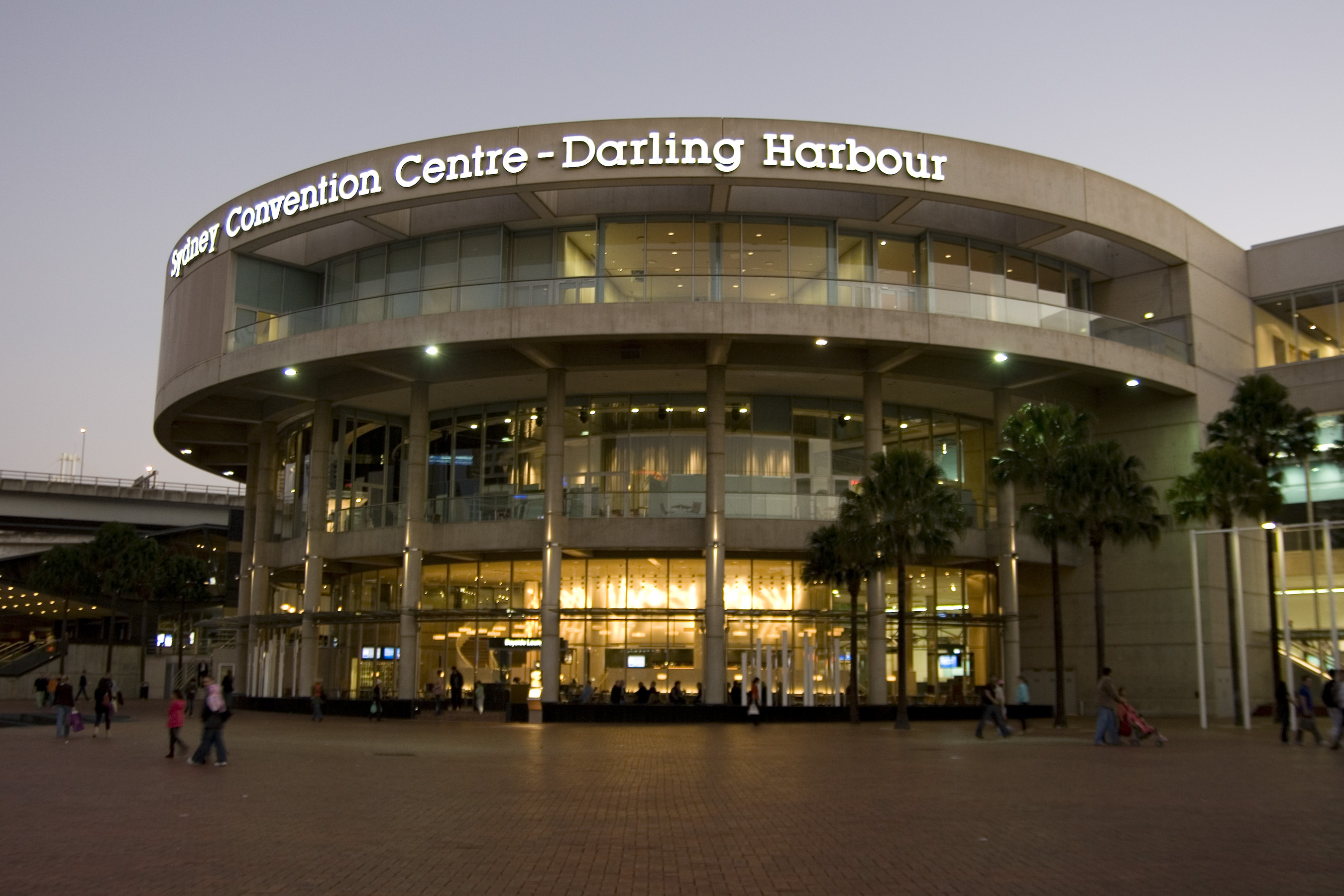
The Sydney Convention Centre hosted fencing at the 2000 Summer Olympics.

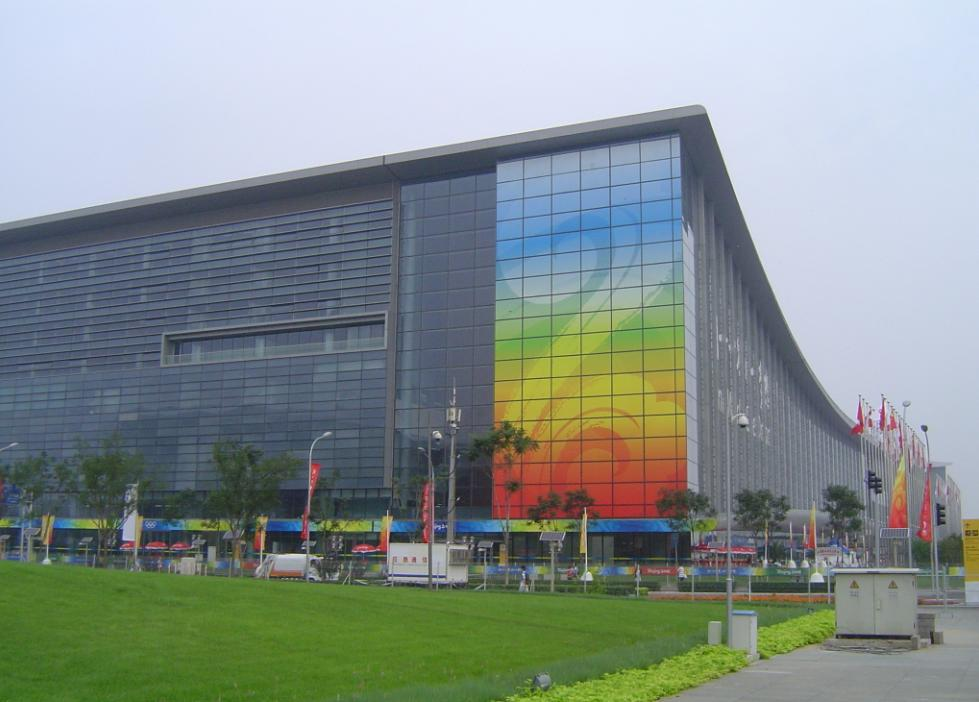
The Olympic Green Convention Center hosted fencing at the 2008 Summer Olympics in Beijing.

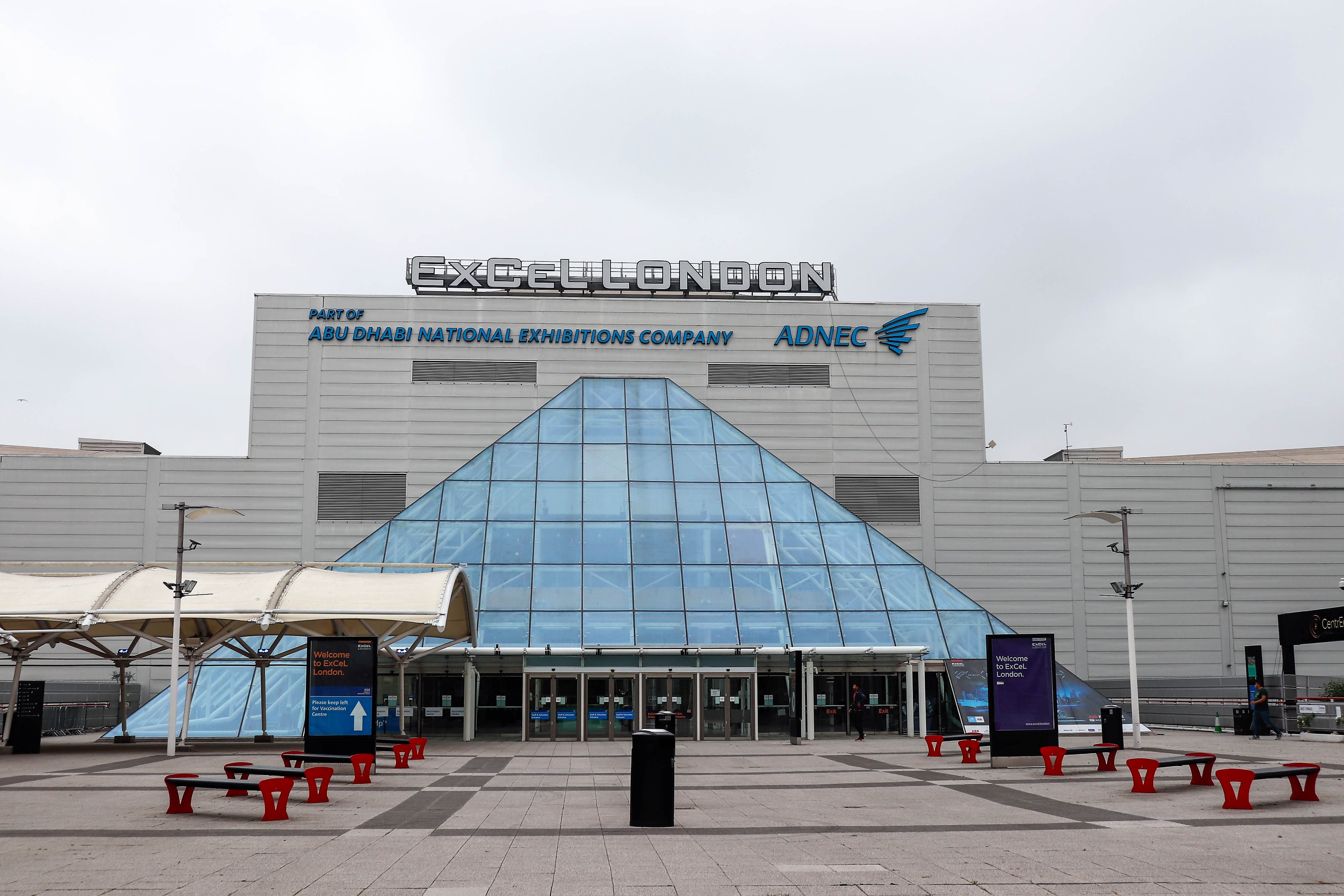
Excel London hosted fencing at the 2012 Summer Olympics.

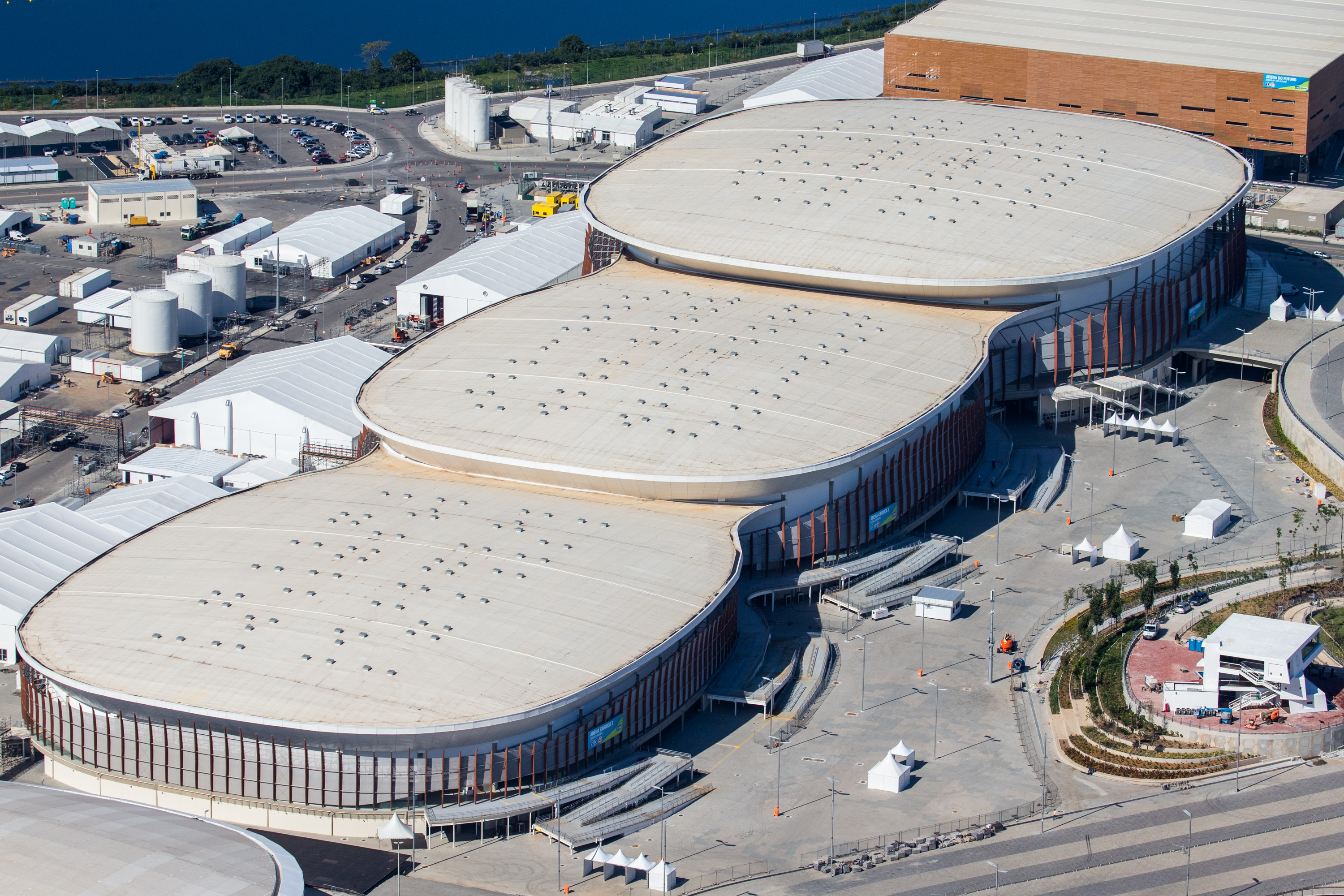
Carioca Arena 3 hosted fencing at the 2016 Summer Olympics in Rio de Janeiro.

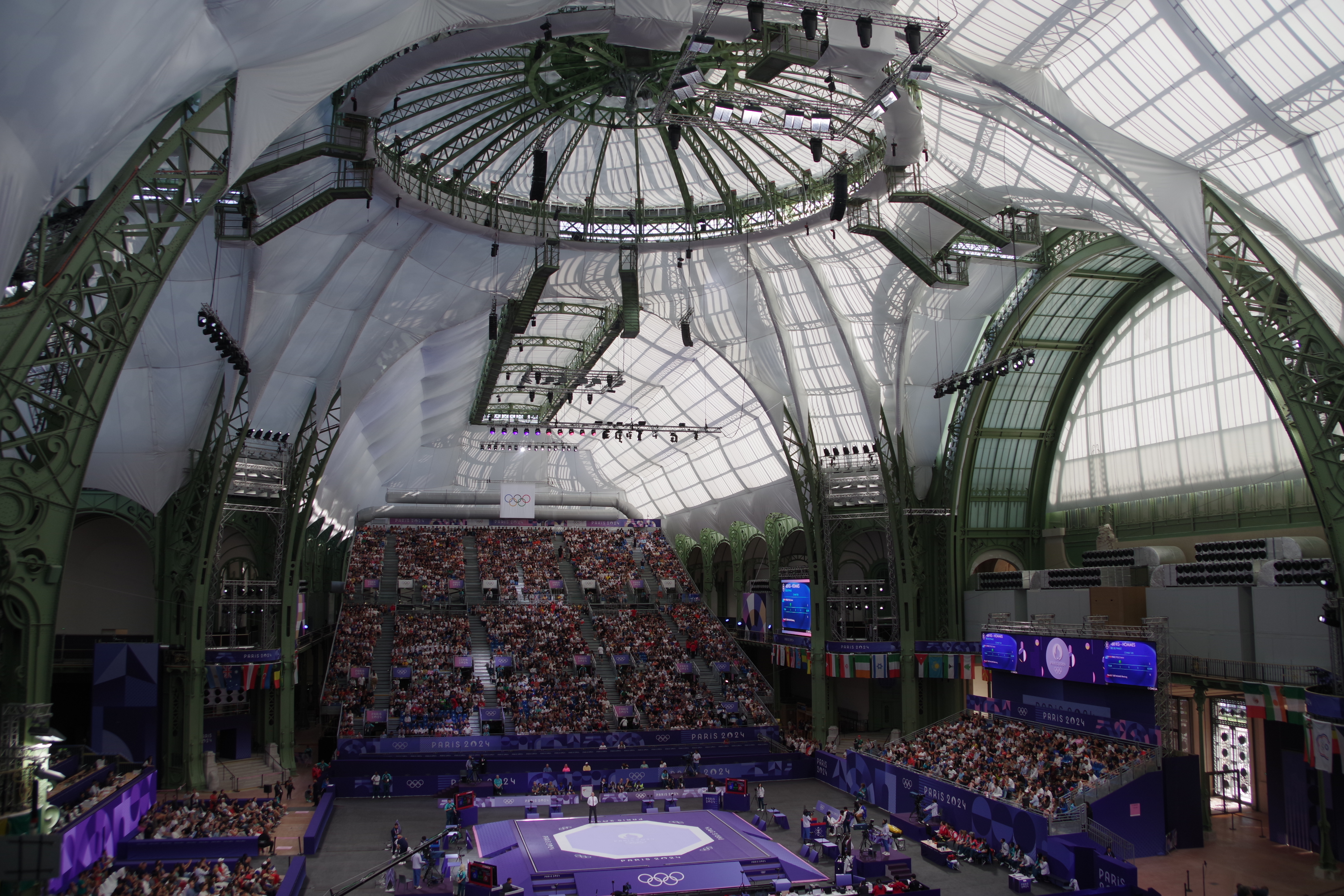
The Grand Palais hosted fencing at the 2024 Summer Olympics in Paris.

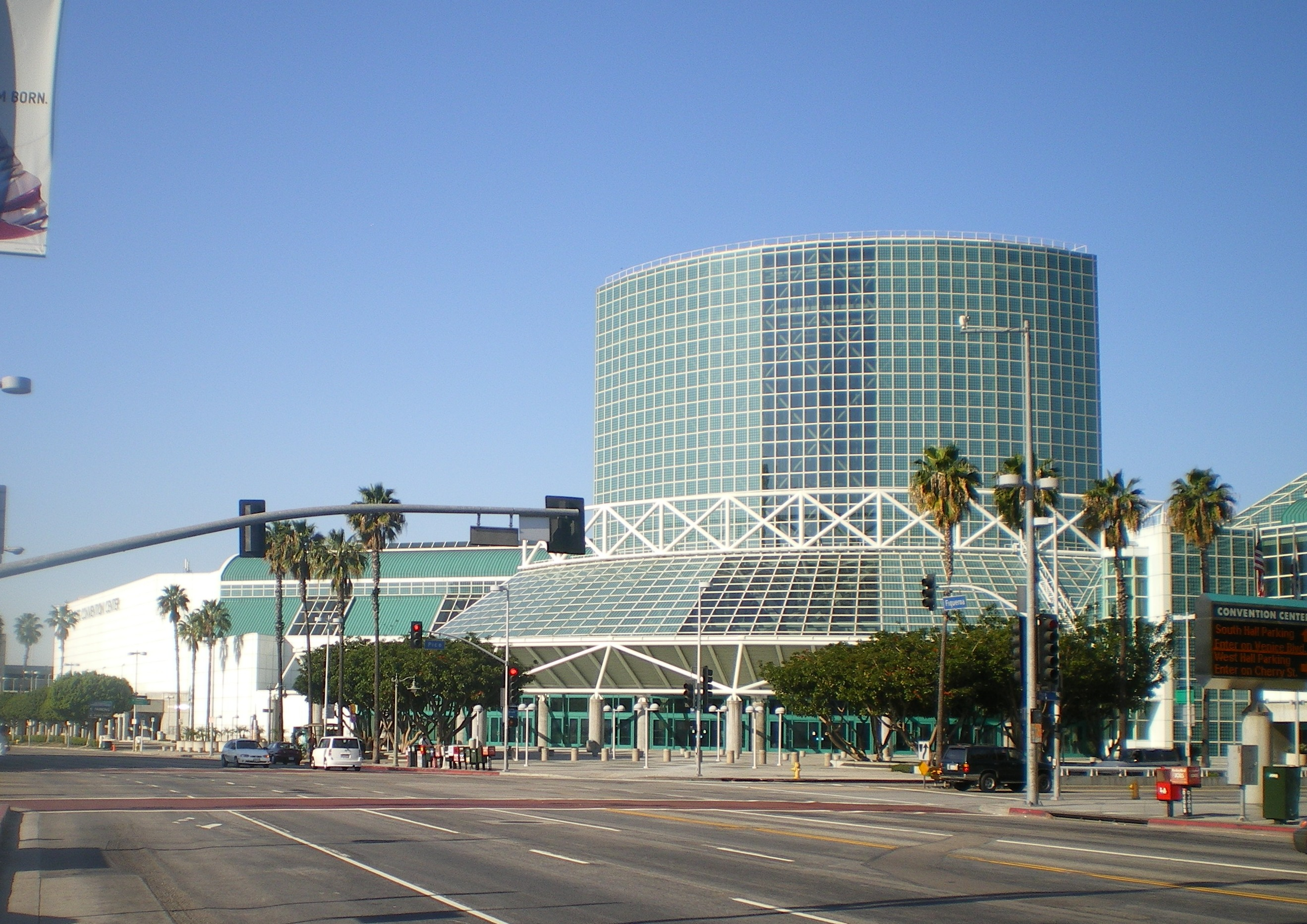
The Los Angeles Convention Center will host fencing at the 2028 Summer Olympics.
