= Fencing at the 1904 Summer Olympics – Men's épée =

Men's épée at the Games of the III Olympiad
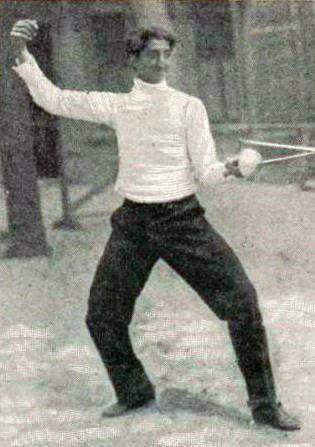
- Gold medalist Ramón Fonst (shown in 1900)
- Venue: Francis Gymnasium, Washington University in St. Louis
- Date: September 7, 1904
- Competitors: 5 from 3 nations

Medalists
1st place, gold medalist(s)		Ramón Fonst; Cuba
2nd place, silver medalist(s)		Charles Tatham; United States
3rd place, bronze medalist(s)		Albertson Van Zo Post; United States

The men's épée was a fencing event held as part of the fencing programme at the 1904 Summer Olympics. It was the second time the event was held at the Olympics. 5 fencers from 3 nations competed. The competition was held on September 7, 1904. The event was won by Ramón Fonst of Cuba, repeating as Olympic champion in the individual épée. The silver medal went to Charles Tatham and the bronze to Albertson Van Zo Post. Tatham and Van Zo Post were both Americans, but the International Olympic Committee's results page showed them as Cuban for more than a century until it was finally corrected in the early 2020s.

== Background ==
This was the second appearance of the event, which was not held at the first Games in 1896 (with only foil and sabre events held) but has been held at every Summer Olympics since 1900.

Ramón Fonst of Cuba, the gold medalist in 1900, returned. Albertson Van Zo Post had been the United States champion in 1896. Charles Tatham was the United States champion in 1901, 1902, and 1903. The 1904 American champion, Charles Bothner, did not compete.

Germany made its debut in the event. Cuba and the United States each appeared for the second time, the only two nations to have competed at both épée appearances to date.

== Competition format ==
The competition, with only 5 fencers, consisted of a single round-robin final pool. Under the rules of the Amateur Fencing League of America, which are thought to have been used, bouts were to three touches. A point was scored for each touch, with a 0.25 point deduction for double-touches. Points were used to determine placement.

== Schedule ==
Date	Time	Round
Wednesday, 7 September 1904		Semifinals; Final

== Results ==
Specifics on the épée competition are unknown, though the final rankings of the 5 fencers are known.

Rank	Fencer	Nation
1st place, gold medalist(s)	Ramón Fonst	Cuba
2nd place, silver medalist(s)	Charles Tatham	United States
3rd place, bronze medalist(s)	Albertson Van Zo Post	United States
4	Gustav Casmir	Germany
5	Fitzhugh Townsend	United States

== Sources ==
- Wudarski, Pawel (1999). "Wyniki Igrzysk Olimpijskich" (in Polish). Archived from the original on 16 February 2009.
