= Cuba at the Olympics =

- IOC code: CUB
- NOC: Cuban Olympic Committee
- Medals Ranked 18th: Gold 86 Silver 70 Bronze 88 Total 244

Summer appearances
- 1900; 1904; 1908–1920; 1924; 1928; 1932–1936; 1948; 1952; 1956; 1960; 1964; 1968; 1972; 1976; 1980; 1984–1988; 1992; 1996; 2000; 2004; 2008; 2012; 2016; 2020; 2024

Cuba first participated at the Olympic Games in 1900, and has sent athletes to compete in 22 out of 29 Summer Olympic Games overall, up to and including the 2024 Paris Olympics.

Cuban athletes have never participated in the Winter Olympic Games. Among those nations that have never participated at Winter Olympics, Cuba is the most successful Olympic team, in both gold and total medals won.

Cuba ranks second out of all American countries in terms of Summer Olympics gold medals, trailing only the United States, and has won more medals than any other nation in Latin America. Cuba, which never hosted the Olympics, has won the fourth highest total number of medals (after Hungary, Romania, and Poland) among nations that have never hosted the Games.

The National Olympic Committee for Cuba is the Cuban Olympic Committee (Spanish: Comité Olímpico Cubano), established in 1926 and recognized by the International Olympic Committee in 1954.

== Medal tables ==
Games	Athletes	Gold	Silver	Bronze	Total	Rank
(French Third Republic) 1900 Paris	1	1	1	0	2	12
(United States) 1904 St. Louis	4	3	0	0	3	4
(United Kingdom) 1908 London	did not participate					
(Sweden) 1912 Stockholm	did not participate					
(Belgium) 1920 Antwerp	did not participate					
(French Third Republic) 1924 Paris	9	0	0	0	0	–
(Netherlands) 1928 Amsterdam	1	0	0	0	0	–
(United States) 1932 Los Angeles	did not participate					
(Nazi Germany) 1936 Berlin	did not participate					
(United Kingdom) 1948 London	53	0	1	0	1	28
(Finland) 1952 Helsinki	29	0	0	0	0	–
(Australia) 1956 Melbourne	16	0	0	0	0	–
(Italy) 1960 Rome	12	0	0	0	0	–
(Japan) 1964 Tokyo	27	0	1	0	1	30
1968 Mexico City	115	0	4	0	4	31
(West Germany) 1972 Munich	137	3	1	4	8	14
(Canada) 1976 Montreal	156	6	4	3	13	8
(Soviet Union) 1980 Moscow	207	8	7	5	20	4
(United States) 1984 Los Angeles	did not participate					
(South Korea) 1988 Seoul	did not participate					
(Spain) 1992 Barcelona	176	14	6	11	31	5
(United States) 1996 Atlanta	164	9	8	8	25	8
(Australia) 2000 Sydney	229	11	11	7	29	9
(Greece) 2004 Athens	151	9	7	11	27	11
(China) 2008 Beijing	149	3	10	17	30	19
(United Kingdom) 2012 London	111	5	3	7	15	16
(Brazil) 2016 Rio de Janeiro	124	5	2	4	11	18
(Japan) 2020 Tokyo	70	7	3	5	15	14
(France) 2024 Paris	61	2	1	6	9	32
(United States) 2028 Los Angeles	future event					
(Australia) 2032 Brisbane	future event					
Total (22/30)	2,002	86	70	88	244	18

=== Medals by sport ===
Leading in that sport

Sport	Gold	Silver	Bronze	Total
Boxing	42	19	19	80
Wrestling	12	7	13	32
Athletics	11	14	20	45
Judo	6	15	16	37
Fencing	4	3	3	10
Baseball	3	2	0	5
Volleyball	3	0	2	5
Weightlifting	2	1	5	8
Canoeing	1	3	1	5
Taekwondo	1	2	4	7
Shooting	1	1	3	5
Swimming	0	1	1	2
Cycling	0	1	0	1
Sailing	0	1	0	1
Basketball	0	0	1	1
Totals (15 entries)	86	70	88	244

== List of medalists since 2000 ==
Medal	Name	Games	Sport	Event
Gold	Anier García	(Australia) 2000 Sydney	Athletics	Men's 110m hurdles
Gold	Iván Pedroso	(Australia) 2000 Sydney	Athletics	Men's long jump
Gold	Guillermo Rigondeaux	(Australia) 2000 Sydney	Boxing	Men's bantamweight
Gold	Félix Savón	(Australia) 2000 Sydney	Boxing	Men's heavyweight
Gold	Mario Kindelán	(Australia) 2000 Sydney	Boxing	Men's lightweight
Gold	Jorge Gutiérrez	(Australia) 2000 Sydney	Boxing	Men's middleweight
Gold	Legna Verdecia	(Australia) 2000 Sydney	Judo	Women's 52 kg
Gold	Sibelis Veranes	(Australia) 2000 Sydney	Judo	Women's 70 kg
Gold	Ángel Matos	(Australia) 2000 Sydney	Taekwondo	Men's 80 kg
Gold	Women's volleyball team	(Australia) 2000 Sydney	Volleyball	Women's team competition
Gold	Filiberto Azcuy	(Australia) 2000 Sydney	Wrestling (Greco-Roman)	Men's Greco-Roman
Silver	Javier Sotomayor	(Australia) 2000 Sydney	Athletics	Men's high jump
Silver	Cuba national baseball team	(Australia) 2000 Sydney	Baseball	Baseball
Silver	Ledis Balceiro	(Australia) 2000 Sydney	Canoeing	Men's C-1 1000m
Silver	Leobaldo Pereira; Ibrahim Rojas	(Australia) 2000 Sydney	Canoeing	Men's C-2 1000m
Silver	Driulis González	(Australia) 2000 Sydney	Judo	Women's 57 kg
Silver	Daima Beltrán	(Australia) 2000 Sydney	Judo	Women's +78 kg
Silver	Urbia Melendez	(Australia) 2000 Sydney	Taekwondo	Women's 49 kg
Silver	Yoel Romero	(Australia) 2000 Sydney	Wrestling (Freestyle)	Men's freestyle 85 kg
Silver	Lázaro Rivas	(Australia) 2000 Sydney	Wrestling (Greco-Roman)	Men's Greco-Roman 54 kg
Silver	Juan Marén	(Australia) 2000 Sydney	Wrestling (Greco-Roman)	Men's Greco-Roman 63 kg
Bronze	José Ángel César; Iván García; Freddy Mayola; Luis Alberto Pérez-Rionda	(Australia) 2000 Sydney	Athletics	Men's 4 × 100 m
Bronze	Osleidys Menéndez	(Australia) 2000 Sydney	Athletics	Women's javelin throw
Bronze	Maikro Romero	(Australia) 2000 Sydney	Boxing	Men's light flyweight
Bronze	Diógenes Luña	(Australia) 2000 Sydney	Boxing	Men's light welterweight
Bronze	Nelson Loyola; Carlos Pedroso; Iván Trevejo	(Australia) 2000 Sydney	Fencing	Men's team épée
Bronze	Manolo Poulot	(Australia) 2000 Sydney	Judo	Men's 60 kg
Bronze	Alexis Rodríguez	(Australia) 2000 Sydney	Wrestling (Freestyle)	Men's freestyle 130 kg
Gold	Osleidys Menéndez	(Greece) 2004 Athens	Athletics	Women's javelin throw
Gold	Yumileidi Cumbá	(Greece) 2004 Athens	Athletics	Women's shot put
Gold	Guillermo Rigondeaux Ortiz	(Greece) 2004 Athens	Boxing	Men's bantamweight
Gold	Yuriorkis Gamboa Toledano	(Greece) 2004 Athens	Boxing	Men's flyweight
Gold	Odlanier Solís Fonte	(Greece) 2004 Athens	Boxing	Men's heavyweight
Gold	Yan Bartelemí Varela	(Greece) 2004 Athens	Boxing	Men's light flyweight
Gold	Mario Cesar Kindelan Mesa	(Greece) 2004 Athens	Boxing	Men's lightweight
Gold	Yandro Miguel Quintana	(Greece) 2004 Athens	Wrestling (Freestyle)	Men's 55–60 kg
Silver	Yipsi Moreno	(Greece) 2004 Athens	Athletics	Women's hammer throw
Silver	Yudel Johnson Cedeno	(Greece) 2004 Athens	Boxing	Men's light welterweight
Silver	Lorenzo Aragon Armenteros	(Greece) 2004 Athens	Boxing	Men's welterweight
Silver	Ledis Frank Balceiro Pajon; Ibrahim Rojas Blanco	(Greece) 2004 Athens	Canoeing	Men's C-2 500m
Silver	Daima Mayelis Beltran	(Greece) 2004 Athens	Judo	Women's heavyweight
Silver	Yanelis Yuliet Labrada Diaz	(Greece) 2004 Athens	Taekwondo	Women's -49 kg
Silver	Roberto Monzon	(Greece) 2004 Athens	Wrestling (Greco-Roman)	Men's 55–60 kg
Bronze	Cuba national volleyball team	(Greece) 2004 Athens	Volleyball	Women's competition
Bronze	Anier García	(Greece) 2004 Athens	Athletics	Men's 110m hurdles
Bronze	Yunaika Crawford	(Greece) 2004 Athens	Athletics	Women's hammer throw
Bronze	Michel Lopez Nunez	(Greece) 2004 Athens	Boxing	Men's super heavyweight
Bronze	Yordanis Arencibia	(Greece) 2004 Athens	Judo	Men's half-lightweight
Bronze	Yurisel Laborde	(Greece) 2004 Athens	Judo	Women's half-heavyweight
Bronze	Amarilis Savón	(Greece) 2004 Athens	Judo	Women's half-lightweight
Bronze	Driulys González	(Greece) 2004 Athens	Judo	Women's half-middleweight
Bronze	Yurisleidy Lupetey	(Greece) 2004 Athens	Judo	Women's lightweight
Bronze	Juan Miguel Rodríguez	(Greece) 2004 Athens	Shooting	Men's skeet (125 targets)
Bronze	Iván Fundora	(Greece) 2004 Athens	Wrestling (Freestyle)	Men's 66–74 kg
Gold	Dayron Robles	(China) 2008 Beijing	Athletics	Men's 110m hurdles
Gold	Mijaín López	(China) 2008 Beijing	Wrestling (Greco-Roman)	Men's 120 kg
Gold	Yipsi Moreno	(China) 2008 Beijing	Athletics	Women's hammer throw
Silver	Misleydis González	(China) 2008 Beijing	Athletics	Women's shot put
Silver	Cuba national baseball team	(China) 2008 Beijing	Baseball	Baseball
Silver	Yankiel León	(China) 2008 Beijing	Boxing	Men's Bantamweight
Silver	Andry Laffita	(China) 2008 Beijing	Boxing	Men's flyweight
Silver	Emilio Correa Bayeaux	(China) 2008 Beijing	Boxing	Men's middleweight
Silver	Carlos Banteux	(China) 2008 Beijing	Boxing	Men's welterweight
Silver	Yoanka González	(China) 2008 Beijing	Cycling (Track)	Women's points race
Silver	Yanet Bermoy	(China) 2008 Beijing	Judo	Women's -48 kg
Silver	Anaysi Hernández	(China) 2008 Beijing	Judo	Women's -70 kg
Silver	Yalennis Castillo	(China) 2008 Beijing	Judo	Women's -78 kg
Bronze	Ibrahim Camejo	(China) 2008 Beijing	Athletics	Men's long jump
Bronze	Leonel Suárez	(China) 2008 Beijing	Athletics	Men's decathlon
Bronze	Yampier Hernández	(China) 2008 Beijing	Boxing	Men's light flyweight
Bronze	Yordenis Ugás	(China) 2008 Beijing	Boxing	Men's lightweight
Bronze	Osmai Acosta Duarte	(China) 2008 Beijing	Boxing	Men's heavyweight
Bronze	Roniel Iglesias	(China) 2008 Beijing	Boxing	Men's light welterweight
Bronze	Yordanis Arencibia	(China) 2008 Beijing	Judo	Men's -66 kg
Bronze	Óscar Brayson	(China) 2008 Beijing	Judo	Men's +100 kg
Bronze	Idalys Ortiz	(China) 2008 Beijing	Judo	Women's +78 kg
Bronze	Eglis Yaima Cruz	(China) 2008 Beijing	Shooting	Women's 50m rifle 3 positions
Bronze	Daynellis Montejo	(China) 2008 Beijing	Taekwondo	Women's 49 kg
Bronze	Michel Batista	(China) 2008 Beijing	Wrestling	Men's freestyle 96 kg
Bronze	Yordanis Borrero	(China) 2008 Beijing	Weightlifting	Men's 69 kg
Bronze	Jadier Valladares	(China) 2008 Beijing	Weightlifting	Men's 85 kg
Bronze	Yoandry Hernández	(China) 2008 Beijing	Weightlifting	Men's 94 kg
Bronze	Disney Rodríguez	(China) 2008 Beijing	Wrestling	Men's freestyle 120 kg
Bronze	Yargelis Savigne	(China) 2008 Beijing	Athletics	Women's triple jump
Gold	Robeisy Ramírez	(United Kingdom) 2012 London	Boxing	Men's flyweight
Gold	Roniel Iglesias	(United Kingdom) 2012 London	Boxing	Men's lightweight
Gold	Idalys Ortiz	(United Kingdom) 2012 London	Judo	Women's +78 kg
Gold	Leuris Pupo	(United Kingdom) 2012 London	Shooting	Men's 25m rapid fire pistol
Gold	Mijaín López	(United Kingdom) 2012 London	Wrestling (Greco-Roman)	Men's 120 kg
Silver	Yarisley Silva	(United Kingdom) 2012 London	Athletics	Women's pole vault
Silver	Asley González	(United Kingdom) 2012 London	Judo	Men's -90 kg
Silver	Yanet Bermoy	(United Kingdom) 2012 London	Judo	Women's -52 kg
Bronze	Leonel Suárez	(United Kingdom) 2012 London	Athletics	Men's decathlon
Bronze	Yarelys Barrios	(United Kingdom) 2012 London	Athletics	Women's discus throw
Bronze	Lázaro Álvarez	(United Kingdom) 2012 London	Boxing	Men's bantamweight
Bronze	Yasniel Toledo	(United Kingdom) 2012 London	Boxing	Men's lightweight
Bronze	Robelis Despaigne	(United Kingdom) 2012 London	Taekwondo	Men's +80 kg
Bronze	Iván Cambar	(United Kingdom) 2012 London	Weightlifting	Men's 77 kg
Bronze	Liván López	(United Kingdom) 2012 London	Wrestling	Men's 66 kg freestyle
Gold	Robeisy Ramírez	(Brazil) 2016 Rio de Janeiro	Boxing	Men's bantamweight
Gold	Julio César La Cruz	(Brazil) 2016 Rio de Janeiro	Boxing	Men's light heavyweight
Gold	Arlen López	(Brazil) 2016 Rio de Janeiro	Boxing	Men's middleweight
Gold	Ismael Borrero	(Brazil) 2016 Rio de Janeiro	Wrestling (Greco-Roman)	Men's 59 kg
Gold	Mijaín López	(Brazil) 2016 Rio de Janeiro	Wrestling (Greco-Roman)	Men's 130 kg
Silver	Idalys Ortiz	(Brazil) 2016 Rio de Janeiro	Judo	Women's +78 kg
Silver	Yasmany Lugo	(Brazil) 2016 Rio de Janeiro	Wrestling (Greco-Roman)	Men's 98 kg
Bronze	Denia Caballero	(Brazil) 2016 Rio de Janeiro	Athletics	Women's discus throw
Bronze	Joahnys Argilagos	(Brazil) 2016 Rio de Janeiro	Boxing	Men's light flyweight
Bronze	Lázaro Álvarez	(Brazil) 2016 Rio de Janeiro	Boxing	Men's lightweight
Bronze	Erislandy Savón	(Brazil) 2016 Rio de Janeiro	Boxing	Men's heavyweight
Gold	Luis Orta	(Japan) 2020 Tokyo	Wrestling	Men's Greco-Roman 60 kg
Gold	Mijaín López	(Japan) 2020 Tokyo	Wrestling	Men's Greco-Roman 130 kg
Gold	Fernando Jorge; Serguey Torres	(Japan) 2020 Tokyo	Canoeing	Men's C-2 1000 metres
Gold	Roniel Iglesias	(Japan) 2020 Tokyo	Boxing	Men's welterweight
Gold	Arlen López	(Japan) 2020 Tokyo	Boxing	Men's light heavyweight
Gold	Julio César La Cruz	(Japan) 2020 Tokyo	Boxing	Men's heavyweight
Gold	Andy Cruz	(Japan) 2020 Tokyo	Boxing	Men's lightweight
Silver	Idalys Ortiz	(Japan) 2020 Tokyo	Judo	Women's +78 kg
Silver	Juan Miguel Echevarría	(Japan) 2020 Tokyo	Athletics	Men's long jump
Silver	Leuris Pupo	(Japan) 2020 Tokyo	Shooting	Men's 25 metre rapid fire pistol
Bronze	Rafael Alba	(Japan) 2020 Tokyo	Taekwondo	Men's +80 kg
Bronze	Maykel Massó	(Japan) 2020 Tokyo	Athletics	Men's long jump
Bronze	Yaime Pérez	(Japan) 2020 Tokyo	Athletics	Women's discus throw
Bronze	Lázaro Álvarez	(Japan) 2020 Tokyo	Boxing	Men's featherweight
Bronze	Reineris Salas	(Japan) 2020 Tokyo	Wrestling	Men's freestyle 97 kg
Gold	Mijaín López	(France) 2024 Paris	Wrestling	Men's Greco-Roman 130 kg
Gold	Erislandy Álvarez	(France) 2024 Paris	Boxing	Men's 63.5 kg
Silver	Yusneylys Guzmán	(France) 2024 Paris	Wrestling	Women's freestyle 50 kg
Bronze	Arlen López	(France) 2024 Paris	Boxing	Men's 80 kg
Bronze	Gabriel Rosillo	(France) 2024 Paris	Wrestling	Men's Greco-Roman 97 kg=
Bronze	Luis Orta	(France) 2024 Paris	Wrestling	Men's Greco-Roman 67 kg
Bronze	Yarisleidis Cirilo	(France) 2024 Paris	Canoeing	Women's C-1 200 m
Bronze	Rafael Alba	(France) 2024 Paris	Taekwondo	Men's +80 kg
Bronze	Milaimys Marín	(France) 2024 Paris	Wrestling	Women's freestyle 76 kg

== Summary by sport ==
=== Fencing ===
Cuba's Olympic debut in 1900 featured one fencer, Ramón Fonst, who won the men's amateur épée contest and finished second in the amateurs–masters event (behind a professional). Fonst would repeat as épée champion in 1904. The IOC credits Cuba with the other two medals in the 1904 épée event as well, despite Charles Tatham (silver) and Albertson Van Zo Post (bronze) being from the United States.

Games	Fencers	Events	Gold	Silver	Bronze	Total
1900 Paris	1	2/7	1	1	0	2
Total			5	5	6	16

=== Boxing ===
Despite having a population of just over 11 million, Cuba has won the second highest amount of Olympic medals in boxing, with a total of 41 gold medals and 78 medals in total. The country's boxing culture, strong grassroots program, specialized training and support, and investment in sports infrastructure have all contributed to the development of world-class boxers.

== See also ==
- Category:Olympic competitors for Cuba
- List of flag bearers for Cuba at the Olympics
- Cuba at the Paralympics
