= Fencing at the 1904 Summer Olympics =

Fencing at the Games of the III Olympiad
- Venue: Washington University in St. Louis; Francis Olympic Field
- Dates: 7–8 September 1904

At the 1904 Summer Olympics, five fencing events were contested. The third edition of the Olympic fencing program included a team event (in men's foil) for the first time, as well as the only Olympic singlestick competition. Events for fencing professionals were eliminated. The competitions were held on September 7, 1904 and September 8, 1904.

== Medal summary ==
Event	Gold	Silver	Bronze
Épée	Ramón Fonst; Cuba	Charles Tatham; United States	Albertson Van Zo Post; United States
Foil, Individual	Ramón Fonst; Cuba	Albertson Van Zo Post; United States	Charles Tatham; United States
Foil, Team	Mixed team Ramón Fonst (CUB); Albertson Van Zo Post (USA); Manuel Díaz (CUB)	United States; Charles Tatham; Fitzhugh Townsend; Arthur Fox	None awarded
Sabre	Manuel Díaz; Cuba	William Grebe; United States	Albertson Van Zo Post; United States
Singlestick	Albertson Van Zo Post; United States	William O'Connor; United States	William Grebe; United States

== Participating nations ==
A total of 11 fencers from 3 nations competed at the St. Louis Games:

- Cuba (2)
- Germany (1)
- United States (8)

== Medal table ==
Rank	Nation	Gold	Silver	Bronze	Total
1	Cuba	3	0	0	3
2	United States	1	5	4	10
–	Mixed team	1	0	0	1
Totals (2 entries)		5	5	4	14
