= Arthur Fox (fencer) =

English-American fencer

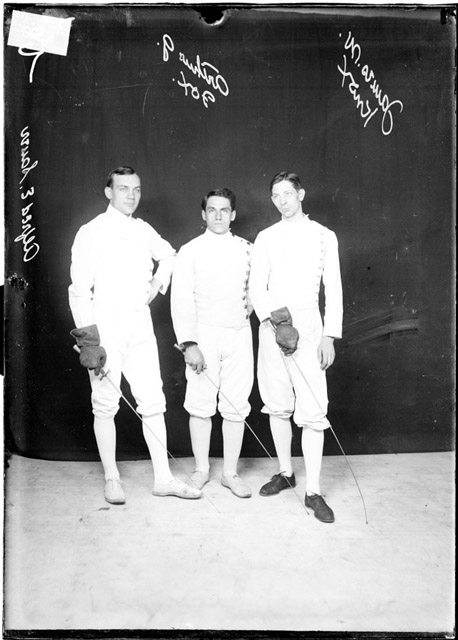
- Arthur G. Fox (middle).

Medal record

Men's Fencing

Representing United States

Olympic Games
Silver medal – second place	1904 St Louis	Team foil

Arthur George Fox (September 9, 1878 – August 17, 1958) was an English-American fencer who competed in the 1904 Summer Olympics.

Taking up fencing as a sport in his native United Kingdom, he emigrated to the United States at some point. After his emigration to the US, in 1904, he won the silver medal in team foil competition. He also competed in the individual foil event but was eliminated in the first round. In the individual sabre event he finished fifth.

He was born in Cowes, Isle of Wight, England and died in Los Angeles, California, USA.
