= Fitzhugh Townsend =

American fencer

Olympic medal record

Men's Fencing

Representing United States
Silver medal – second place	1904 St Louis	Team foil

Samuel George Fitzhugh Townsend (April 1872 – December 11, 1906) was an American fencer who competed in the 1904 Summer Olympics. He competed under the name Fitzhugh Townsend. It was known that Fitzhugh was his middle name and was thought for a long time that his first name was Charles. However his graduation program from Columbia University, his death announcement in the Columbia alumni newsletter, and his tombstone in the Trinity Cemetery in New York City all give his full name as Samuel George Fitzhugh Townsend.

Townsend was a graduate of Columbia University in New York City with a degree in physics. He fenced for the Columbia Lions fencing team. After graduation, he became a professor at Columbia University teaching electrical engineering.

In 1904 he won the silver medal in team foil competition. He also competed in the individual foil event but was eliminated in the first round. In the individual épée event he finished fifth.

He died of typhus in 1906 and is buried in the Townsend family plot in Trinity Cemetery in New York City.
