= Fencing at the Summer Olympics =

- IOC Code: FEN
- Governing body: FIE
- Events: 12 (men: 6; women: 6)

Summer Olympics
- 1896; 1900; 1904; 1908; 1912; 1920; 1924; 1928; 1932; 1936; 1948; 1952; 1956; 1960; 1964; 1968; 1972; 1976; 1980; 1984; 1988; 1992; 1996; 2000; 2004; 2008; 2012; 2016; 2020; 2024; 2028; 2032
- Medalists; men; women

Fencing has been contested at every Summer Olympic Games since the birth of the modern Olympic movement at the 1896 Summer Olympics in Athens. There are three forms of Olympic fencing:

- Foil — a light thrusting weapon; the valid target is restricted to the torso; double touches are not allowed.
- Épée — a heavy thrusting weapon; the valid target area covers the entire body; double touches are allowed.
- Sabre — a light cutting and thrusting weapon; the valid target area includes almost everything above the waist (excluding the back of the head and the hands); double touches are not allowed.

== Summary ==
Games	Year	Events	Best Nation
1	1896	3	Greece (1)
2	1900	7	France (1)
3	1904	5	Cuba (1)
4	1908	4	France (2)
5	1912	5	Hungary (1)
6			
7	1920	6	Italy (1)
8	1924	7	France (3)
9	1928	7	France (4)
10	1932	7	Italy (2)
11	1936	7	Italy (3)
12			
13			
14	1948	7	France (5)
15	1952	7	Italy (4)
16	1956	7	Italy (5)
17	1960	8	Soviet Union (1)
18	1964	8	Hungary (2)
19	1968	8	Soviet Union (2)
20	1972	8	Hungary (3)
21	1976	8	Soviet Union (3)
22	1980	8	France (6)
23	1984	8	Italy (6)
24	1988	8	West Germany (1)
25	1992	8	Germany (1)
26	1996	10	Russia (1)
27	2000	10	Italy (7)
28	2004	10	Italy (8)
29	2008	10	France (7)
30	2012	10	Italy (9)
31	2016	10	Russia (2)
32	2020	12	ROC (1)
33	2024	12	Japan (1)
34	2028	12	

== Events ==
=== Men's ===
Current programme
Event	96	00	04	08	12	20	24	28	32	36	48	52	56	60	64	68	72	76	80	84	88	92	96	00	04	08	12	16	20	24	28	Years
Foil, Individual	X	X	X		X	X	X	X	X	X	X	X	X	X	X	X	X	X	X	X	X	X	X	X	X	X	X	X	X	X	X	30
Foil, Team			X			X	X	X	X	X	X	X	X	X	X	X	X	X	X	X	X	X	X	X	X		X	X	X	X	X	26
Épée, Individual		X	X	X	X	X	X	X	X	X	X	X	X	X	X	X	X	X	X	X	X	X	X	X	X	X	X	X	X	X	X	30
Épée, Team				X	X	X	X	X	X	X	X	X	X	X	X	X	X	X	X	X	X	X	X	X	X	X		X	X	X	X	27
Sabre, Individual	X	X	X	X	X	X	X	X	X	X	X	X	X	X	X	X	X	X	X	X	X	X	X	X	X	X	X	X	X	X	X	31
Sabre, Team				X	X	X	X	X	X	X	X	X	X	X	X	X	X	X	X	X	X	X	X	X	X	X	X		X	X	X	27
Total	2	3	4	4	5	6	6	6	6	6	6	6	6	6	6	6	6	6	6	6	6	6	6	6	6	5	5	5	6	6	6	

=== Women's ===
Event	96	00	04	08	12	20	24	28	32	36	48	52	56	60	64	68	72	76	80	84	88	92	96	00	04	08	12	16	20	24	28	Years
Foil, Individual	Not yet introduced						X	X	X	X	X	X	X	X	X	X	X	X	X	X	X	X	X	X	X	X	X	X	X	X	X	25
Foil, Team	Not yet introduced													X	X	X	X	X	X	X	X	X	X	X		X	X		X	X	X	16
Épée, Individual	Not yet introduced																						X	X	X	X	X	X	X	X	X	9
Épée, Team	Not yet introduced																						X	X	X		X	X	X	X	X	8
Sabre, Individual	Not yet introduced																								X	X	X	X	X	X	X	7
Sabre, Team	Not yet introduced																									X		X	X	X	X	5
Total	0	0	0	0	0	0	1	1	1	1	1	1	1	2	2	2	2	2	2	2	2	2	4	4	4	5	5	5	6	6	6	

=== Past events ===
- Men's foil, masters: 1896, 1900
- Men's singlestick: 1904

Only at the 1900 Summer Olympics:

- Men's épée, masters
- Men's sabre, masters
- Men's épée, amateurs-masters

== Nations ==
Numbers indicate the number of fencers each nation sent to that Olympics.

Nation	96	00	04	08	12	20	24	28	32	36	48	52	56	60	64	68	72	76	80	84	88	92	96	00	04	08	12	16	20	24	28	Years
Algeria																			1				2	2	7	2	2	2	4	4		9
Argentina		1					13	9	5	11	19	11	1	6	11	10	5	7		10	2	5	4	3	1	1	1	2	1	1		23
Aruba																					1											1
Australia												6	21	11	18	5	4	3	3	3	2	2	1	7	3	2						15
Austria	1	8		1	12		5	6	1	15	7	8	1	9	5	5	13	5		8	5	5	3	6	2	1	1	1				25
Azerbaijan																							1		1		1	1	1	1		6
Bahrain																					4											1
Belarus																							1	4	2	3	4	1				6
Belgium		5		18	11	22	19	21	7	20	18	14	6	15	2	3	1	4	3	4	2				1			1		1		22
Benin																												1				1
Bohemia				7	13																											2
Bolivia																				1	1		1									3
Brazil										6	7	5				4		1			4	4		1	3	2	3	13	2	3		14
Bulgaria								2		1				2			5	5	5		5		3				1	1		1		11
Burkina Faso																										1						1
Canada				1					5	8	6	2	1	1	3	5	6	13		15	18	16	7	4	6	9	5	5	11	12		22
Cape Verde																														1		1
Chile							1	6		7	3				3			1					1	1	1	1	2		1	1		13
China																				18	15	15	9	13	19	20	16	11	14	12		11
Chinese Taipei																				2	2						1			1		4
Colombia											2		6	2	5						5	2	2	2	1		1	2	1	1		13
Republic of the Congo																									1							1
Costa Rica										1												1										2
Croatia																											1					1
Cuba		1	2				6				6	1		1	2	13	15	13	13			5	7	11	4	2		1				17
Cyprus																														1		1
Czech Republic																							1					2	2	4		4
Czechoslovakia						9	7	7		13	5						2	3	7			5										9
Denmark	1	1		8	6	8	11	10	7	9	15	12	1	1			6	1	1				1									17
Egypt						1	3	8		6	9	8			5	4				6	2	1		5	9	10	12	7	14	16		18
Estonia																						2	6	4		1	1	5	4	1		8
Finland								2			6	11	2	6			1	4	5		1		1									10
France	4	211		22		18	24	20	11	19	21	21	18	21	20	20	19	18	16	20	19	20	15	16	19	15	13	15	18	18		28
Georgia																							1					1	1	1		4
Germany		1	1	10	16			13	2	16		9										20	15	18	12	9	14	4	9	2		17
East Germany																4	5	1	15		7											5
West Germany																20	19	16		20	20											5
Great Britain		3	1	23	22	18	20	19	3	18	19	17	9	18	13	17	19	21	11	20	13	15	2	3	2	3	12	3	1			28
Greece	9				7	3	6	5		8	6						3			1		1	1		9		1	2	1	1		16
Guatemala												3											1									2
Haiti		2																		2												2
Honduras																						1										1
Hong Kong																	2	4		5	7	3			3	3	6	3	8	4		12
Hungary		6		8	13		10	17	10	19	18	17	18	21	20	20	19	18	18		20	20	15	13	15	15	4	9	13	12		26
Independent Olympic Athletes																						1										1
India																													1			1
Indonesia													1	4							2	2					1					5
Iran		1													4		2	15									1	2	4	3		8
Ireland											5	4		6	2	4	1					1				1						8
Israel														2			2	1		4		1	3	1	1	3		1		1		11
Italy		8		11	9	19	19	18	14	16	19	18	19	20	20	19	19	21	14	20	20	20	16	17	12	16	19	14	24	18		28
Ivory Coast																												1		2		2
Japan												1	1	5	15	5	5	8		9	10	6	4	4	5	7	10	6	21	14		18
Jordan																				1	1											2
Kazakhstan																							1	5			3	1	1	4		6
Kenya																														1		1
Kuwait																		4	9	9	8	1	1	1				1		1		9
Kyrgyzstan																								1		1			1			3
Latvia																								1								1
Lebanon														4	4	3	4		2	4	2	2					2	1		1		11
Luxembourg											6	4	4	10	2	1	5	2					1									9
Malaysia															1												1					2
Mexico								2	10	2	9	4	3	8		14	6			1	1				1	1	2	7	1	1		17
Monaco														2			1			1	1											4
Morocco														7											1	2	2	1	1	2		7
Netherlands		1		13	12	10	17	20	2	11	9			5			1				5				1	2	1	1	1	1		18
Netherlands Antilles															1	3																2
New Zealand														1						2	1	1			1							5
Niger																														1		1
Norway				1	7		4	5		5	5	5		1		2	5	10		6				3		1	1					15
Panama																				1						1		1				3
Paraguay																1		1			2	2	1									5
Peru		1									3					1	1									1			1	1		7
Philippines																					1	1								1		3
Poland							5	6	6	11	7	13	6	21	15	20	20	18	18		18	20	11	10	3	13	8	4	5	9		23
Portugal					1	8	10	7		5	6	10		9		4				1	3	4	1	1	1	2						16
Puerto Rico														1		1	2	4		2			1	1								7
Qatar																										1						1
Romania								8		7		8	2	15	11	10	19	18	18	11	2	15	9	5	6	5	10	6	2	1		21
Russia		2			24																		15	15	18	14	18	16	26			9
Rwanda																														1		1
Saar												5																				1
Saudi Arabia																				7		1						1				3
Senegal																									2	3	1	1	1	1		6
Serbia and Montenegro																							1	1								2
Singapore																						2							2	2		3
South Africa				1	1																	5			3	7				1		6
South Korea															5					7	20	15	13	7	12	10	17	14	18	11		12
South Vietnam												1		1	2	1																4
Soviet Union												16	20	21	20	20	20	18	18		20											9
Spain		1					13	9						11					4	2	8	17	11	4	1	5			1	2		14
Sweden		1		7	18	8	9	8	3	13	8	10	5	7	7	6	6	7	6	6	11	6	2	1		1						23
Switzerland		3				8	10	9	1	18	19	10		7	5	5	12	6		5	7	3	5	5	1	2	3	4	4	2		24
Thailand																		7							2	2						3
Tunisia														4									1	1	2	2	6	5	8	2		9
Turkey							1	4		7	6						4			2								1	1	2		9
Ukraine																							6	10	10	10	8	10	6	6		8
Unified Team																						20										1
United Team of Germany													1	19	19																	3
United Arab Republic														6																		1
United States		3	7		13	17	21	16	21	22	20	20	18	21	18	20	19	19		20	19	16	15	8	15	13	16	14	23	15		27
Uruguay							6			5	5	2	1	2		1																7
Uzbekistan																							1	1			1		3	1		5
Venezuela												10		8		4				2			4	1	4	8	6	6	2	4		12
Vietnam																											1	4				2
Virgin Islands																				4										1		2
Zambia															1																	1
Yugoslavia								2		12				1																		3
Nations	4	19	3	14	16	13	23	27	16	29	30	32	23	42	30	34	37	34	20	32	42	42	46	40	42	45	44	48	42	52		
Fencers	15	260	11	131	185	149	240	259	108	311	294	286	165	344	259	275	298	281	187	262	317	305	224	217	223	234	244	212	261	212		
Year	96	00	04	08	12	20	24	28	32	36	48	52	56	60	64	68	72	76	80	84	88	92	96	00	04	08	12	16	20	24	28	

== Medal table ==
Accurate as of the conclusion of the 2024 Summer Olympics

Rank	Nation	Gold	Silver	Bronze	Total
1	Italy	50	49	36	135
2	France	45	47	38	130
3	Hungary	39	25	29	93
4	Soviet Union	18	15	16	49
5	Russia	13	5	8	26
6	West Germany	7	8	1	16
7	South Korea	7	4	8	19
8	United States	6	12	19	37
9	Germany	5	7	9	21
10	China	5	7	3	15
11	Poland	4	9	10	23
12	Romania	4	6	7	17
13	Cuba	4	3	3	10
14	ROC (ROC)	3	4	1	8
15	Belgium	3	3	4	10
16	Japan	3	3	2	8
17	Ukraine	3	1	5	9
18	Hong Kong	3	0	0	3
19	Sweden	2	3	2	7
20	Greece	2	1	2	5
21	Great Britain	1	8	0	9
22	Switzerland	1	4	3	8
23	Denmark	1	2	3	6
24	Unified Team	1	2	2	5
25	Austria	1	1	5	7
26	United Team of Germany	1	1	2	4
27	Estonia	1	0	1	2
28	Mixed team	1	0	0	1
28	Venezuela	1	0	0	1
30	Egypt	0	1	1	2
30	Tunisia	0	1	1	2
32	East Germany	0	1	0	1
32	Mexico	0	1	0	1
32	Norway	0	1	0	1
35	Netherlands	0	0	5	5
36	Bohemia	0	0	2	2
36	Czech Republic	0	0	2	2
38	Argentina	0	0	1	1
38	Canada	0	0	1	1
38	Portugal	0	0	1	1
38	Spain	0	0	1	1
Totals (41 entries)		235	235	234	704

== See also ==
- List of Olympic venues in fencing
- Wheelchair fencing at the Summer Paralympics
