= Fencing at the 1904 Summer Olympics – Men's singlestick =

Men's singlestick at the Games of the III Olympiad
- Venue: Francis Gymnasium, Washington University in St. Louis
- Date: September 8, 1904
- Competitors: 3 from 1 nation

Medalists
1st place, gold medalist(s)		Albertson Van Zo Post	United States
2nd place, silver medalist(s)		William O'Connor	United States
3rd place, bronze medalist(s)		William Grebe	United States

The men's singlestick was an event held as part of the fencing programme at the 1904 Summer Olympics. It was the only time the event was held at the Olympics. Three fencers competed. The competition was held on Thursday, September 8, 1904. Van Zo Post was credited as Cuban in the IOC's database despite the fact that he was an American, this was corrected in 2021.

== Results ==
=== Final ===
Place	Name	Score
1st place, gold medalist(s)	Albertson Van Zo Post (USA)	11
2nd place, silver medalist(s)	William O'Connor (USA)	8
3rd place, bronze medalist(s)	William Grebe (USA)	2
