= William Grebe =

American fencer (1869–1960)

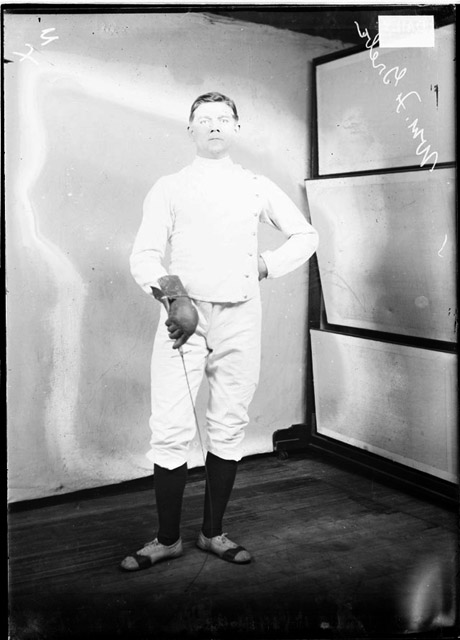

Medal record

Men's Fencing

Olympic Games
Silver medal – second place	1904 St Louis	Sabre
Bronze medal – third place	1904 St Louis	Singlestick

William F. Grebe (March 9, 1869 – June 29, 1960) was an American fencer who competed in the 1904 Summer Olympics. In 1904 he won the silver medal in individual sabre competition and a bronze medal in singlestick competition. He also competed in the individual foil event but was eliminated in the first round. In 1906 he won the U.S. national championship in dueling sword (now known as épée). He is also known to have competed in the 1910 and 1912 U.S. national championships but was eliminated in the preliminary rounds both times.

Grebe's 1904 Silver would be the only U.S. Olympic medal in men's saber until Peter Westbrook won a bronze medal in 1984 and Daryl Homer won a silver medal in 2016. The U.S. has never won gold in men's saber.
