= Ramón Fonst =

Cuban fencer (1883–1959)

Olympic medal record

Men's fencing

Representing Cuba
Gold medal – first place	1900 Paris	épée
Gold medal – first place	1904 St. Louis	foil
Gold medal – first place	1904 St. Louis	épée
Silver medal – second place	1900 Paris	Amateurs-masters épée

Representing a Mixed team
Gold medal – first place	1904 St. Louis	Team foil

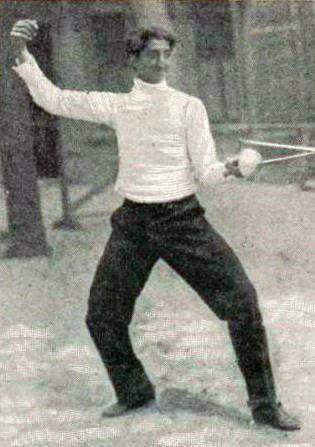
Ramón Fonst in 1900

Ramón Fonst Segundo (August 31, 1883 – September 9, 1959) was a Cuban fencer who competed in the early 20th century. He was one of the greatest world fencers, individual and by team; he was born and died in Havana. He became the first non-European and the only Hispanic American to win an Olympic fencing title.

Although Fonst was born in Cuba, he spent most of his youth in France, where he received his fencing education, and aged just 16 years old he entered the 1900 Summer Olympics which were being held in Paris. He entered the Men's épée event, which put him up against another 101 fencers from 10 other countries, in his first round group he came out top against the five fencers from France, so advanced into the next round, in the next round and again in a group of six fencers Fonst only managed to finish in third place but was still good enough to advance to the semi-finals, and again he would finish third in the group and so qualifying for the final. In the final, Fonst was up against seven French and one Argentine fencer, and against the odds (and the judges) Fonst won four of his six matches to win the gold medal and so became the first Cuban and first Latin American medalist on the Olympic stage.

A few days later after his gold medal, Fonst competed in the Men's amateurs-masters épée which put the top four amateurs with the top four professionals at the Games, Fonst managed to win six of his seven contests and won the silver medal, his only defeat was against the French professional Albert Ayat who went on to win the gold medal.

Four years later, Fonst was in St. Louis, Missouri, competing at the 1904 Summer Olympics, and within two days he won three gold medals, retained his Olympic title in the Men's épée, added the Men's foil title and under the Mixed team banner won the Men's team foil event with fellow Cuban Manuel Díaz and American Albertson Van Zo Post.

Cuba didn't compete in the Summer Olympics again until 1924, which was again held in Paris, France. Now aged 40, Fonst again competed in the Men's épée but this time only managed to reach the semi-final. He also competed in the Men's team épée but they were knocked out of the competition in the quarter-finals.

Fonst also competed at three Central American and Caribbean Games in 1926, 1930 and 1938 and won six more gold medals.

He fenced often with George Worth, who later became an American Olympic medalist fencer, during Worth's two years in Cuba after fleeing Hungary at the outset of World War II.

After his career as an active sportsmen Fonst became president of the National Olympic Committee for Cuba, as well as an adviser for the Department of Physical Education and Sports, which he served until he died from a diabetic coma in 1959, aged 76 years old.
