= Theodore Carstens =

American fencer

Personal information
- Born: June 20, 1879 Cedarburg, Wisconsin, United States
- Died: July 25, 1955 (aged 76) Milwaukee, Wisconsin, United States

Sport
- Sport: Fencing

Theodore Carstens (June 20, 1879 – July 25, 1955) was an American fencer. He competed in the individual foil and sabre events at the 1904 Summer Olympics.
