= Cuban Olympic Committee =

National Olympic Committee

- Country: Cuba
- [[|]]
- Code: CUB
- Created: 1926
- Recognized: 1955
- Continental Association: PASO
- Headquarters: Havana, Cuba
- President: José Fernández Álvarez
- Secretary General: Ruperto Herrera Tabio
- Website: olympic.org/cuba

The Cuban Olympic Committee (Spanish: Comité Olímpico Cubano; IOC Code: CUB) is the organization that represents Cuban athletes in the International Olympic Committee (IOC), the Pan American Games and the Central American and Caribbean Games. It was created in Havana in 1926; however, it was not formally recognized by the IOC until 1955. The organization is currently directed by José Fernández Álvarez.

The Cuban Olympic Committee is headquartered in Havana, Cuba.

== See also ==
- Cuba at the Olympics
