= Charles Tatham (fencer) =

American fencer

Olympic medal record

Men's Fencing

Representing United States
Silver medal – second place	1904 St Louis	Épée
Silver medal – second place	1904 St Louis	Team foil
Bronze medal – third place	1904 St Louis	Foil

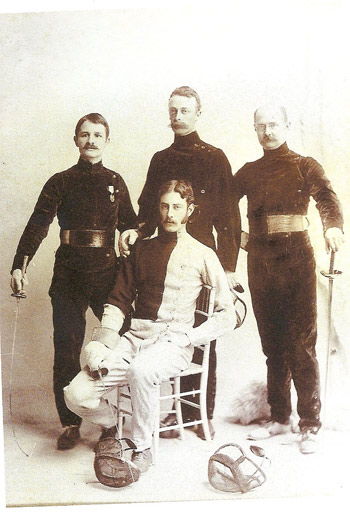
Tatham (center standing) with William Scott O'Connor, C. C. Nadal, and Albertson Van Zo Post in 1891

Charles T. Tatham (September 3, 1854 – September 24, 1939) was an American fencer who competed in the 1904 Summer Olympics. He was born and died in New York City and worked for his father's lead manufacturing company in Philadelphia. In 1891, Tatham was one of the founders of the AFLA/USFA.

Tatham won both the National Individual Epee title and the National Individual Foil title in 1901 and repeated as the individual epee champion in 1902 and 1903. He was a member of the National Team Epee title winners in 1908.

At the 1904 Summer Olympics in St. Louis, Tatham won silver medals in the individual épée and team foil competition, and a bronze medal in the individual foil competition. Although born in the United States, the official 1904 Olympic Report indicated that Tatham represented Cuba. While the vast majority of Olympic athletes at the 1904 games were from the United States (over 80%), many were listed as representing a country of their ancestry.

His father-in-law was the novelist Edward Payson Roe.

== See also ==
- List of USFA Hall of Fame members
