= Manuel Díaz (fencer) =

Cuban fencer

Olympic medal record

Men's fencing

Representing Cuba
| Gold medal – first place | 1904 St Louis | Sabre |

Representing a Mixed team
| Gold medal – first place | 1904 St Louis | Team foil |

Manuel Dionysios Díaz Martínez (April 8, 1874 – February 20, 1929) was a Cuban fencer who competed in the 1904 Summer Olympics. He was born in Havana and died in Rochester, Minnesota.

In 1904 he won the gold medal in the individual sabre and team foil competition. He also fenced at Harvard College.
