= Albertson Van Zo Post =

American fencer

A. Van Zo Post
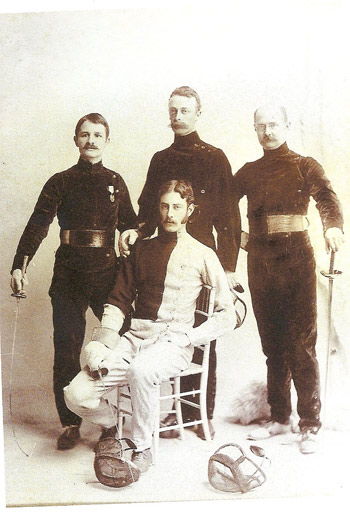
- Van Zo Post (seated) with William Scott O'Connor, Charles Tatham, and C. C. Nadal in 1891

Medal record

Men's fencing

Representing United States

Olympic Games
Gold medal – first place	1904 St. Louis	Singlestick
Gold medal – first place	1904 St. Louis	Team foil
Silver medal – second place	1904 St. Louis	Foil
Bronze medal – third place	1904 St. Louis	Épée
Bronze medal – third place	1904 St. Louis	Sabre

Albertson Van Zo Post (July 28, 1866 – January 23, 1938) was an American fencer and writer. He earned two gold medals in the 1904 Summer Olympics as well as a silver and two bronze medals, and also competed in the 1912 Summer Olympics.

Post was born in Cincinnati, Ohio, to Caroline Burnet, a daughter of General Nathaniel McLean, and Henry A. V. Post, an engineer and sharpshooter during the American Civil War. Albertson, known as Van Zo, was the eldest of seven children; his brother Edwin married the etiquette writer Emily Post. He studied civil engineering at the Columbia College School of Mines, graduating in 1889. Shortly after the outbreak of the Spanish–American War, Van Zo entered the 12th Infantry Regiment of the U.S. Army, serving from May 2 to December 22, 1898 and achieving the rank of captain.

In the 1904 Summer Olympics in St. Louis, Post won the gold medal in the singlestick and team foil competition, silver in individual foil and bronze in individual épée and individual sabre. Although from the United States, Van Zo Post was listed as representing Cuba in the Olympics. The majority (81%) of Olympic athletes at the 1904 games were from the United States, but were listed as representing various countries. Eight years later in Stockholm he reached to the quarterfinals in individual foil, individual épée and individual sabre and did not advance from first round in the team épée competition.

He was also an author, penning the novels Retz (1908) and Diana Ardway (1913), the latter of which was adapted into the 1919 silent comedy Satan Junior.

In 1933, at the age of 65, Post married the educator Meta Louise Anderson. Post died in New York City in 1938, and his widow died in 1942.

== See also ==
- List of USFA Hall of Fame members
