= Francis Gymnasium =

Building at Washington University in St. Louis

Coordinates: 38°38′55.7″N 90°18′53.1″W

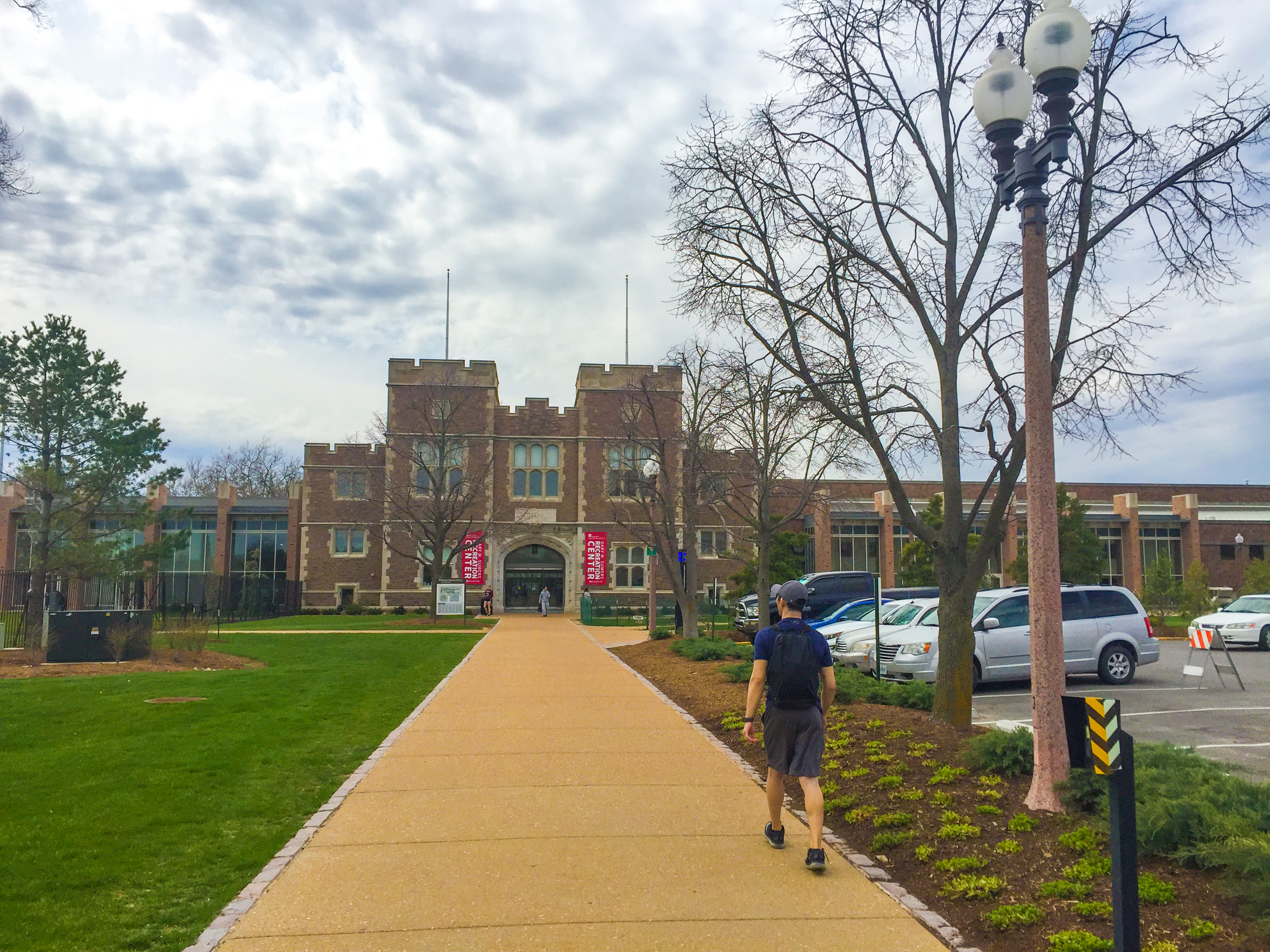
Francis Gymnasium, Washington University in St. Louis, April 2018

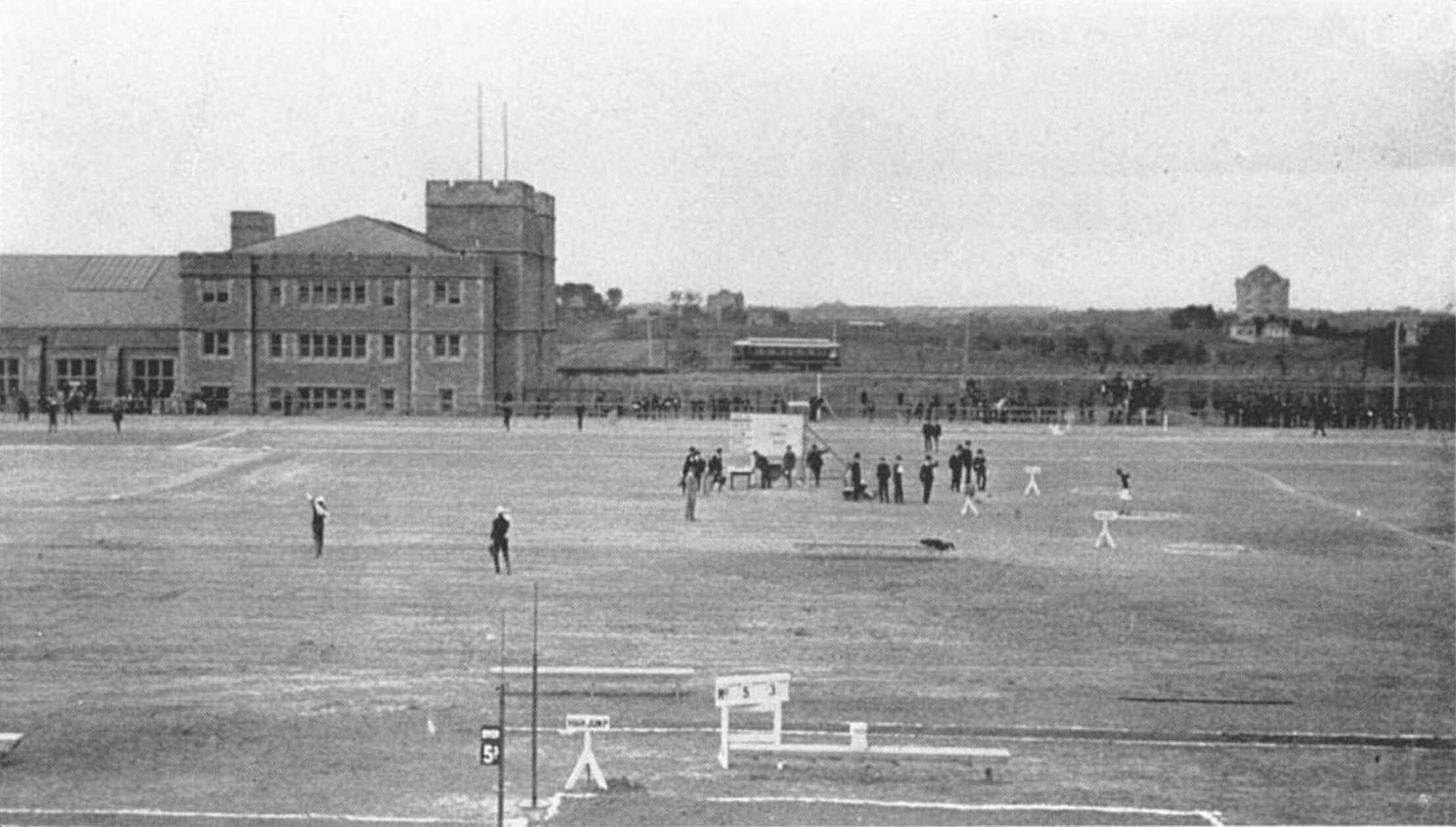
1904 Olympics. Francis Gymnasium can be seen in the background.

Francis Gymnasium is a building at Washington University in St. Louis, currently used by the university's athletics department. Built in 1903, it is located in St. Louis County, Missouri, on the far western edge of the university's Danforth Campus. It is part of the Washington University Hilltop Campus Historic District.

Completed in time for 1904's Louisiana Purchase Exposition, the gymnasium was used as the main indoor venue for the 1904 Summer Olympics, hosting the boxing and fencing events.

After the Olympics, the building was turned over to the Washington University Athletics Department. In the early 1920s, a field house and a swimming pool were built next to Francis Gym. In 1985, a major renovation connected Francis Gym and the renovated field house with additional facilities and recreation space, and replaced the pool with the Millstone Pool. Built in 1985, the Millstone pool is an 8-lane pool with an adjustable bulkhead making it from 25 yards to 25 meters in length.
