= Gymnastics at the 1904 Summer Olympics – Men's combined =

Men's combined apparatus gymnastics at the Games of the III Olympiad
- Dates: October 28, 1904
- Competitors: ? from ? nations

Medalists
1st place, gold medalist(s)		Anton Heida	United States
2nd place, silver medalist(s)		George Eyser	United States
3rd place, bronze medalist(s)		William Merz	United States

The men's combined was an artistic gymnastics event held as part of the gymnastics programme at the 1904 Summer Olympics, and was held on Friday, October 28. 1904 was the second time a combined apparatus event was held at the Olympics, though the previous incarnation was more similar to the all-around turnverein which took place in July. The format of the combined, however, was the basis for later all-around type events.

An unknown number of gymnasts competed, only five are known, with possibly ten gymnasts competing in total. The scores were a sum of the gymnasts' scores in the parallel bars, horizontal bar, vault, and pommel horse events.

== Results ==
Place	Gymnast	Total	parallel	horizontal	vault	pommel
1	Anton Heida (USA)	161	43	40	36	42
2	George Eyser (USA)	152	44	39	36	33
3	William Merz (USA)	135			31	29
4	John Duha (USA)		40			
5	Edward Hennig (USA)			40		

== Sources ==
- De Wael, Herman (2000). "Herman's Full Olympians".
- Wudarski, Pawel (1999). "Wyniki Igrzysk Olimpijskich" (in Polish).
