= Pommel horse at the Olympics =

Pommel horse at the Olympic Games
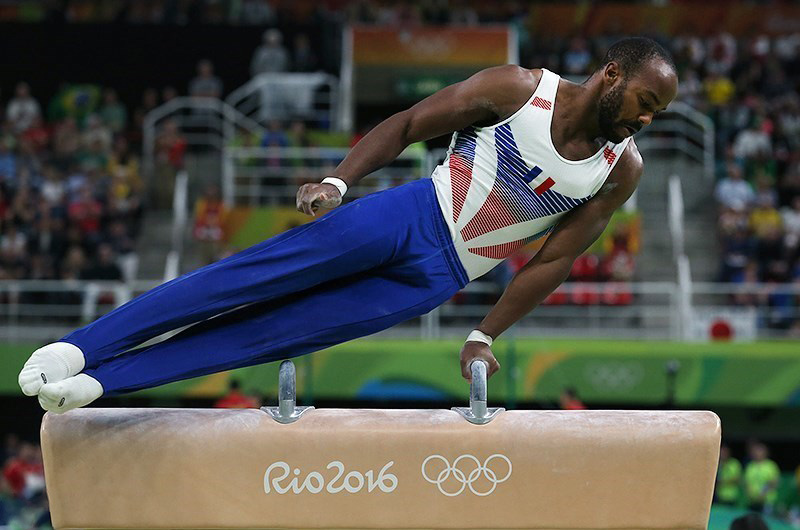
- Pommel horse competition at the 2016 Summer Olympics

Overview
- Sport: Artistic gymnastics
- Gender: Men
- Years held: Men: 1896, 1904, 1924–2024

Reigning champion
- Men: Rhys McClenaghan (IRL)

The pommel horse is an artistic gymnastics event held at the Summer Olympics. The event was first held for men at the first modern Olympics in 1896. It was held again in 1904, but not in 1900, 1908, 1912, or 1920 when no apparatus events were awarded medals. The pommel horse was one of the components of the men's artistic individual all-around in 1900, however. The men's pommel horse returned as a medal event in 1924 and has been held every Games since. Pommel horse scores were included in the individual all-around for 1924 and 1928, with no separate apparatus final. In 1932, the pommel horse was entirely separate from the all-around. From 1936 to 1956, there were again no separate apparatus finals with the pommel horse scores used in the all-around. Beginning in 1960, there were separate apparatus finals.

== Medalists ==
=== Men ===
The medals have been swept four times, something which is no longer possible under current rules: by the United States in 1904, Switzerland in 1924, Finland in 1948, and the Soviet Union in 1952. There have been three-way ties for gold twice (still possible but very unlikely under current rules): 1948 and 1988.

Games	Gold	Silver	Bronze
1896 Athens	Louis Zutter; Switzerland	Hermann Weingärtner; Germany	Not awarded
1900 Paris	Not held		
1904 St. Louis	Anton Heida; United States	George Eyser; United States	William Merz; United States
1908 London	Not held		
1912 Stockholm	Not held		
1920 Antwerp	Not held		
1924 Paris	Josef Wilhelm; Switzerland	Jean Gutweninger; Switzerland	Antoine Rebetez; Switzerland
1928 Amsterdam	Hermann Hänggi; Switzerland	Georges Miez; Switzerland	Heikki Savolainen; Finland
1932 Los Angeles	István Pelle; Hungary	Omero Bonoli; Italy	Frank Haubold; United States
1936 Berlin	Konrad Frey; Germany	Eugen Mack; Switzerland	Albert Bachmann; Switzerland
1948 London	Paavo Aaltonen; Finland Veikko Huhtanen; Finland Heikki Savolainen; Finland	Not awarded	Not awarded
1952 Helsinki	Viktor Chukarin; Soviet Union	Yevgeny Korolkov; Soviet Union Hrant Shahinyan; Soviet Union	Not awarded
1956 Melbourne	Boris Shakhlin; Soviet Union	Takashi Ono; Japan	Viktor Chukarin; Soviet Union
1960 Rome	Eugen Ekman; Finland Boris Shakhlin; Soviet Union	Not awarded	Shuji Tsurumi; Japan
1964 Tokyo	Miroslav Cerar; Yugoslavia	Shuji Tsurumi; Japan	Yury Tsapenko; Soviet Union
1968 Mexico City	Miroslav Cerar; Yugoslavia	Olli Laiho; Finland	Mikhail Voronin; Soviet Union
1972 Munich	Viktor Klimenko; Soviet Union	Sawao Kato; Japan	Eizo Kenmotsu; Japan
1976 Montreal	Zoltán Magyar; Hungary	Eizo Kenmotsu; Japan	Nikolai Andrianov; Soviet Union Michael Nikolay; East Germany
1980 Moscow	Zoltán Magyar; Hungary	Alexander Dityatin; Soviet Union	Michael Nikolay; East Germany
1984 Los Angeles	Li Ning; China Peter Vidmar; United States	Not awarded	Timothy Daggett; United States
1988 Seoul	Lubomir Geraskov; Bulgaria Zsolt Borkai; Hungary Dmitri Bilozertchev; Soviet Union	Not awarded	Not awarded
1992 Barcelona	Vitaly Scherbo; Unified Team Pae Gil-Su; North Korea	Not awarded	Andreas Wecker; Germany
1996 Atlanta	Li Donghua; Switzerland	Marius Urzică; Romania	Alexei Nemov; Russia
2000 Sydney	Marius Urzică; Romania	Eric Poujade; France	Alexei Nemov; Russia
2004 Athens	Teng Haibin; China	Marius Urzică; Romania	Takehiro Kashima; Japan
2008 Beijing	Xiao Qin; China	Filip Ude; Croatia	Louis Smith; Great Britain
2012 London	Krisztián Berki; Hungary	Louis Smith; Great Britain	Max Whitlock; Great Britain
2016 Rio de Janeiro	Max Whitlock; Great Britain	Louis Smith; Great Britain	Alexander Naddour; United States
2020 Tokyo	Max Whitlock; Great Britain	Lee Chih-kai; Chinese Taipei	Kazuma Kaya; Japan
2024 Paris	Rhys McClenaghan; Ireland	Nariman Kurbanov; Kazakhstan	Stephen Nedoroscik; United States

==== Multiple medalists ====
The most successful Olympian on pommel horse is Max Whitlock of Great Britain with two gold medals, in 2016 and 2020, and a bronze in 2012. He shares the title of most decorated Olympian on the apparatus, with three Olympic medals, with close contemporary and compatriot Louis Smith with two silvers and a bronze, and Romanian gymnast Marius Urzică, with one gold medal and two silvers. Three other gymnasts have won the gold medal twice: Soviet Boris Shakhlin, Yugoslav Miroslav Cerar, and Hungarian legend Zoltán Magyar.

Rank	Gymnast	Nation	Olympics	Gold	Silver	Bronze	Total
1	Max Whitlock	Great Britain	2012–2020	2	0	1	3
2	Boris Shakhlin	Soviet Union	1956–1960	2	0	0	2
2	Miroslav Cerar	Yugoslavia	1964–1968	2	0	0	2
2	Zoltán Magyar	Hungary	1976–1980	2	0	0	2
5	Marius Urzică	Romania	1996–2004	1	2	0	3
6	Viktor Chukarin	Soviet Union	1952–1956	1	0	1	2
7	Louis Smith	Great Britain	2008–2016	0	2	1	3
8	Shuji Tsurumi	Japan	1960–1964	0	1	1	2
8	Eizo Kenmotsu	Japan	1972–1976	0	1	1	2
10	Michael Nikolay	East Germany	1976–1980	0	0	2	2
10	Alexei Nemov	Russia	1996–2000	0	0	2	2

==== Medalists by country ====
Rank	Nation	Gold	Silver	Bronze	Total
1	Soviet Union	5	3	4	12
2	Hungary	5	0	0	5
3	Switzerland	4	3	2	9
4	Finland	4	1	1	6
5	China	3	0	0	3
6	Great Britain	2	2	2	6
7	United States	2	1	5	8
8	Yugoslavia	2	0	0	2
9	Romania	1	2	0	3
10	Germany	1	1	1	3
11	Bulgaria	1	0	0	1
11	Ireland	1	0	0	1
11	North Korea	1	0	0	1
11	Unified Team	1	0	0	1
15	Japan	0	4	4	8
16	Chinese Taipei	0	1	0	1
16	Croatia	0	1	0	1
16	France	0	1	0	1
16	Italy	0	1	0	1
16	Kazakhstan	0	1	0	1
21	East Germany	0	0	2	2
21	Russia	0	0	2	2

== Gallery ==
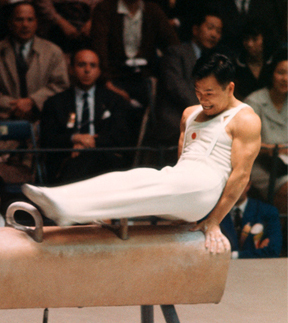
Takashi Ono, 1964

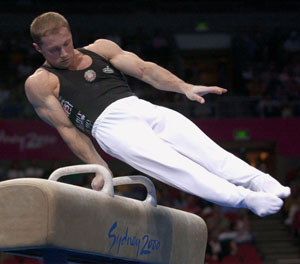
Ivan Ivankov, 2000

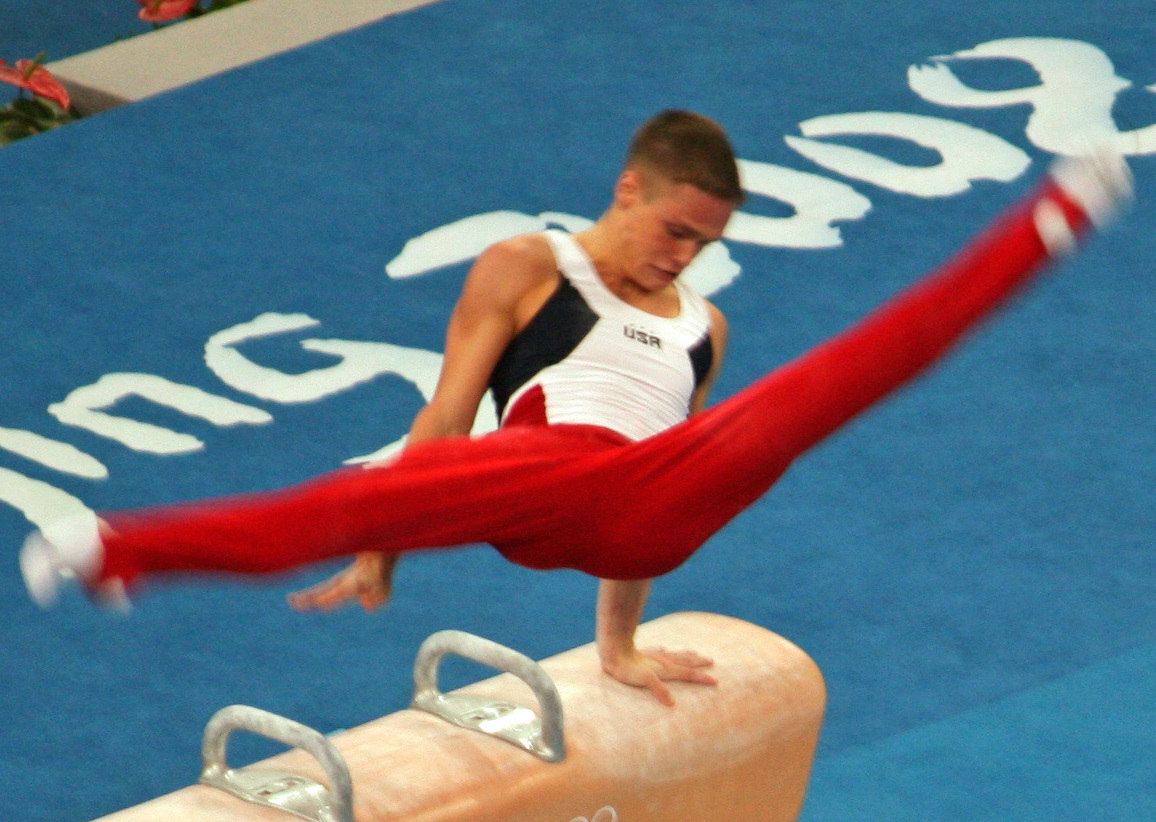
Alexander Artemev, 2008

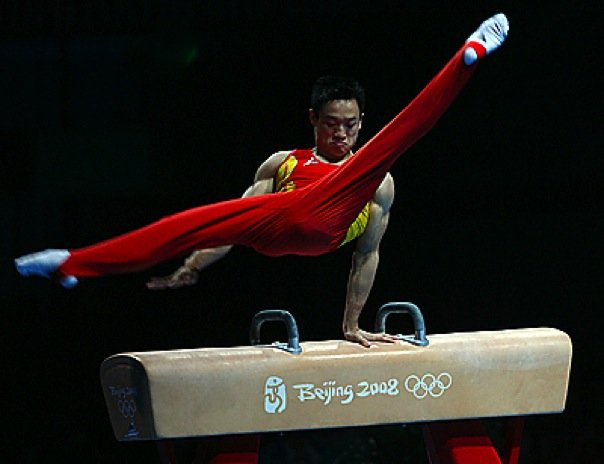
Yang Wei, 2008

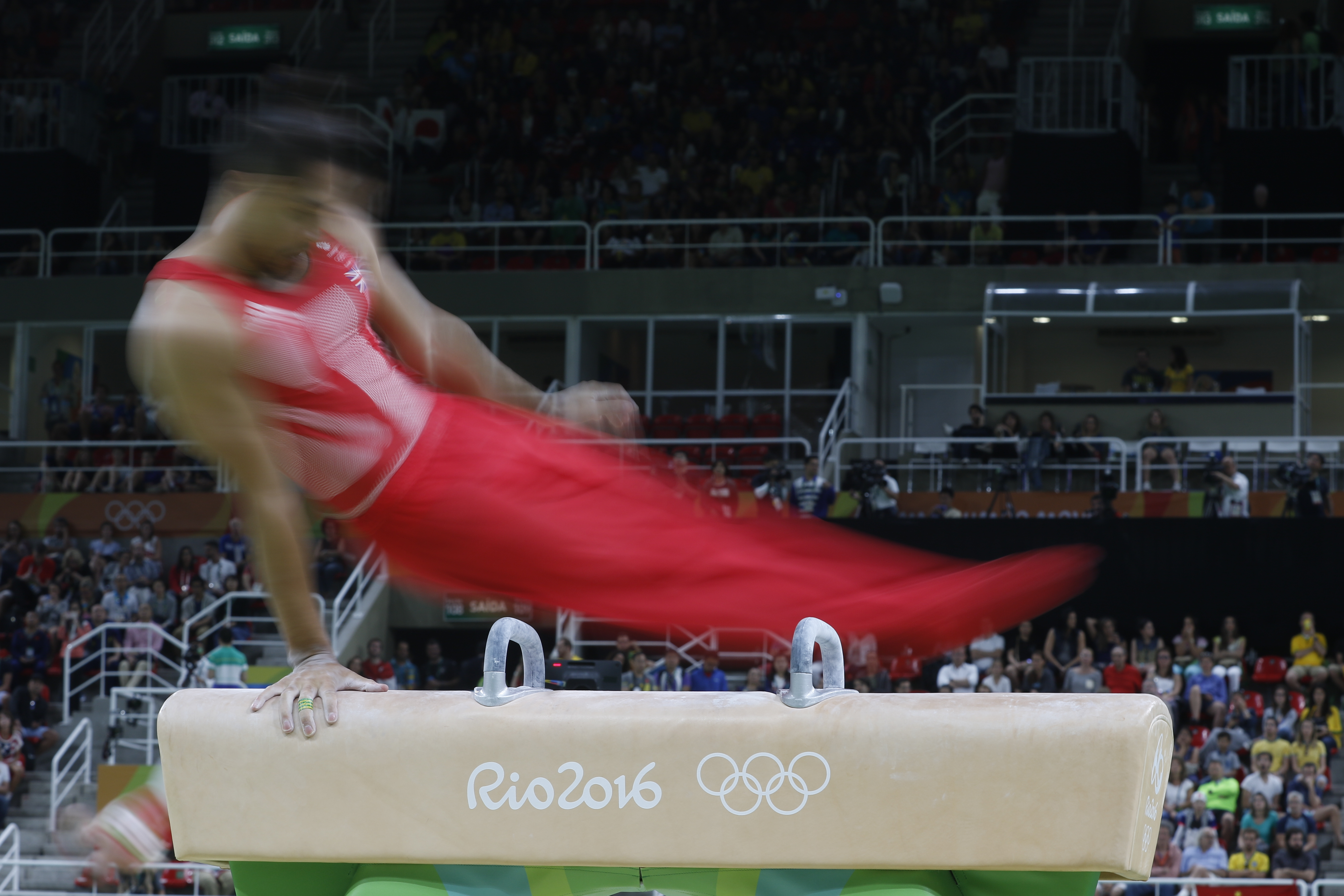
Louis Smith, 2016

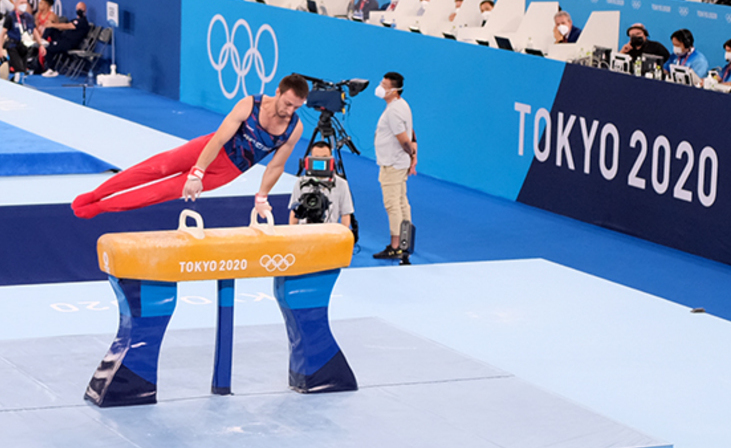
Artur Davtyan, 2020

Men's Pommel Horse at the Olympics
