= List of multiple Olympic medalists at a single Games =

This is a list of most Olympic medals won at a single Olympic Games. Medals won in the 1906 Intercalated Games are not included. It includes top-three placings in 1896 and 1900, before medals were awarded for top-three placings. Only Olympians with four or more medals at one Games are included below.

== List of most medals won at a single Olympic Games ==
Athlete	Nation	Sport	Year	Games	Sex	Gold	Silver	Bronze	Total
Michael Phelps	United States	Swimming	2008	Summer	M	8	–	–	8
Michael Phelps (2)	United States	Swimming	2004	Summer	M	6	–	2	8
Alexander Dityatin	Soviet Union	Gymnastics	1980	Summer	M	3	4	1	8
Mark Spitz	United States	Swimming	1972	Summer	M	7	–	–	7
Matt Biondi	United States	Swimming	1988	Summer	M	5	1	1	7
Willis A. Lee	United States	Shooting	1920	Summer	M	5	1	1	7
Boris Shakhlin	Soviet Union	Gymnastics	1960	Summer	M	4	2	1	7
Nikolay Andrianov	Soviet Union	Gymnastics	1976	Summer	M	4	2	1	7
Lloyd Spooner	United States	Shooting	1920	Summer	M	4	1	2	7
Emma McKeon	Australia	Swimming	2020	Summer	F	4	–	3	7
Maria Gorokhovskaya	Soviet Union	Gymnastics	1952	Summer	F	2	5	–	7
Mikhail Voronin	Soviet Union	Gymnastics	1968	Summer	M	2	4	1	7
Johannes Høsflot Klæbo	Norway	Cross-country skiing	2026	Winter	M	6	–	–	6
Vitaly Scherbo	Unified Team	Gymnastics	1992	Summer	M	6	–	–	6
Kristin Otto	East Germany	Swimming	1988	Summer	F	6	–	–	6
Anton Heida	United States	Gymnastics	1904	Summer	M	5	1	-	6
Michael Phelps (3)	United States	Swimming	2016	Summer	M	5	1	–	6
Michael Phelps (4)	United States	Swimming	2012	Summer	M	4	2	–	6
Ville Ritola	Finland	Athletics	1924	Summer	M	4	2	–	6
Viktor Chukarin	Soviet Union	Gymnastics	1956	Summer	M	4	2	–	6
Věra Čáslavská	Czechoslovakia	Gymnastics	1968	Summer	F	4	2	–	6
Ágnes Keleti (2)	Hungary	Gymnastics	1956	Summer	F	4	2	–	6
Hubert Van Innis	Belgium	Archery	1920	Summer	M	4	2	–	6
Akinori Nakayama	Japan	Gymnastics	1968	Summer	M	4	1	1	6
Larisa Latynina	Soviet Union	Gymnastics	1956	Summer	F	4	1	1	6
Li Ning	China	Gymnastics	1984	Summer	M	3	2	1	6
Larisa Latynina (2)	Soviet Union	Gymnastics	1960	Summer	F	3	2	1	6
Daniela Silivaș	Romania	Gymnastics	1988	Summer	F	3	2	1	6
George Eyser	United States	Gymnastics	1904	Summer	M	3	2	1	6
Hermann Weingärtner	Germany	Gymnastics	1896	Summer	M	3	2	1	6
Takashi Ono	Japan	Gymnastics	1960	Summer	M	3	1	2	6
Konrad Frey	Germany	Gymnastics	1936	Summer	M	3	1	2	6
Burton Downing	United States	Cycling	1904	Summer	M	2	3	1	6
Larisa Latynina (3)	Soviet Union	Gymnastics	1964	Summer	F	2	2	2	6
Alexei Nemov	Russia	Gymnastics	1996	Summer	M	2	1	3	6
Alexei Nemov (2)	Russia	Gymnastics	2000	Summer	M	2	1	3	6
Natalie Coughlin	United States	Swimming	2008	Summer	F	1	2	3	6
Margit Korondi	Hungary	Gymnastics	1952	Summer	F	1	1	4	6
Nedo Nadi	Italy	Fencing	1920	Summer	M	5	–	–	5
Paavo Nurmi (2)	Finland	Athletics	1924	Summer	M	5	–	–	5
Eric Heiden	United States	Speed skating	1980	Winter	M	5	–	–	5
Caeleb Dressel	United States	Swimming	2020	Summer	M	5	–	–	5
John Naber	United States	Swimming	1976	Summer	M	4	1	–	5
Kornelia Ender	East Germany	Swimming	1976	Summer	F	4	1	–	5
Ecaterina Szabo	Romania	Gymnastics	1984	Summer	F	4	1	–	5
Vladimir Artemov	Soviet Union	Gymnastics	1988	Summer	M	4	1	–	5
Katie Ledecky	United States	Swimming	2016	Summer	F	4	1	–	5
Marcus Hurley	United States	Cycling	1904	Summer	M	4	–	1	5
Missy Franklin	United States	Swimming	2012	Summer	F	4	–	1	5
Simone Biles	United States	Gymnastics	2016	Summer	F	4	–	1	5
Johannes Thingnes Bø	Norway	Biathlon	2022	Winter	M	4	–	1	5
Léon Marchand	France	Swimming	2024	Summer	M	4	–	1	5
Alexander Bolshunov (2)	ROC	Cross-country skiing	2022	Winter	M	3	1	1	5
Vilhelm Carlberg	Sweden	Shooting	1912	Summer	M	3	2	–	5
Roger Ducret	France	Fencing	1924	Summer	M	3	2	–	5
Ian Thorpe	Australia	Swimming	2000	Summer	M	3	2	–	5
Lyubov Yegorova	Unified Team	Cross-country skiing	1992	Winter	F	3	2	–	5
Marte Olsbu Røiseland	Norway	Biathlon	2022	Winter	F	3	–	2	5
George Eyser (2)	United States	Gymnastics	1904	Summer	M	3	1	1	5
Charles Daniels	United States	Swimming	1904	Summer	M	3	1	1	5
Clas Thunberg	Finland	Speed skating	1924	Winter	M	3	1	1	5
Shane Gould	Australia	Swimming	1972	Summer	F	3	1	1	5
Nadia Comăneci (2)	Romania	Gymnastics	1976	Summer	F	3	1	1	5
Larisa Lazutina	Russia	Cross-country skiing	1998	Winter	F	3	1	1	5
Marit Bjørgen	Norway	Cross-country skiing	2010	Winter	F	3	1	1	5
Allison Schmitt	United States	Swimming	2012	Summer	F	3	1	1	5
Mollie O'Callaghan	Australia	Swimming	2024	Summer	F	3	1	1	5
Quentin Fillon Maillet	France	Biathlon	2022	Winter	M	2	3	–	5
Ireen Wüst	Netherlands	Speed skating	2014	Winter	F	2	3	–	5
Ryan Lochte	United States	Swimming	2012	Summer	M	2	2	1	5
Natalie Coughlin (2)	United States	Swimming	2004	Summer	F	2	2	1	5
Karin Janz	East Germany	Gymnastics	1972	Summer	F	2	2	1	5
Ines Diers	East Germany	Swimming	1980	Summer	F	2	2	1	5
Marit Bjørgen (2)	Norway	Cross-country skiing	2018	Winter	F	2	1	2	5
Kaylee McKeown (2)	Australia	Swimming	2024	Summer	F	2	1	2	5
Shirley Babashoff	United States	Swimming	1976	Summer	F	1	4	–	5
Nastia Liukin	United States	Gymnastics	2008	Summer	F	1	3	1	5
Alicia Coutts	Australia	Swimming	2012	Summer	F	1	3	1	5
Cindy Klassen	Canada	Speed skating	2006	Winter	F	1	2	2	5
Mary Lou Retton	United States	Gymnastics	1984	Summer	F	1	2	2	5
Yelena Välbe	Unified Team	Cross-country skiing	1992	Winter	F	1	–	4	5
Sturla Holm Lægreid	Norway	Biathlon	2026	Winter	M	–	3	2	5
Roald Larsen	Norway	Speed skating	1992	Winter	M	–	2	3	5
Shannon Miller	United States	Gymnastics	1992	Summer	F	–	2	3	5
William Merz	United States	Gymnastics, Athletics	1904	Summer	M	–	1	4	5
Carl Schuhmann	Germany	Gymnastics, Wrestling	1896	Summer	M	4	–	–	4
Alvin Kraenzlein	United States	Athletics	1900	Summer	M	4	–	–	4
Jesse Owens	United States	Athletics	1936	Summer	M	4	–	–	4
Fanny Blankers-Koen	Netherlands	Athletics	1948	Summer	F	4	–	–	4
Don Schollander	United States	Swimming	1968	Summer	M	4	–	–	4
Carl Lewis	United States	Athletics	1984	Summer	M	4	–	–	4
Amy Van Dyken	United States	Swimming	1996	Summer	F	4	–	–	4
Ole Einar Bjørndalen	Norway	Biathlon	2002	Winter	M	4	–	–	4
Paavo Nurmi	Finland	Athletics	1920	Summer	M	3	1	–	4
Olga Korbut	Soviet Union	Gymnastics	1972	Summer	F	3	1	–	4
Susan Pedersen	United States	Swimming	1968	Summer	F	2	2	–	4
Bjørn Dæhlie	Norway	Cross-country skiing	1992	Winter	M	3	1	–	4
Bjørn Dæhlie (2)	Norway	Cross-country skiing	1998	Winter	M	3	1	–	4
James Lightbody	United States	Athletics	1904	Summer	M	3	1	–	4
Rie Mastenbroek	Netherlands	Swimming	1936	Summer	F	3	1	–	4
Věra Čáslavská (2)	Czechoslovakia	Gymnastics	1964	Summer	F	3	1	–	4
Florence Griffith Joyner	United States	Athletics	1988	Summer	F	3	1	–	4
Lyubov Yegorova (2)	Russia	Cross-country skiing	1994	Winter	F	3	1	–	4
Inge de Bruijn	Netherlands	Swimming	2000	Summer	F	3	1	–	4
Leontien van Moorsel	Netherlands	Cycling	2000	Summer	F	3	1	–	4
Petria Thomas	Australia	Swimming	2004	Summer	F	3	1	–	4
Janica Kostelić	Croatia	Alpine skiing	2002	Winter	F	3	1	–	4
Katinka Hosszú	Hungary	Swimming	2016	Summer	F	3	1	–	4
Marja-Liisa Kirvesniemi	Finland	Cross-country skiing	1984	Winter	F	3	–	1	4
Jim Montgomery	United States	Swimming	1976	Summer	M	3	–	1	4
Michelle Smith de Bruin	Ireland	Swimming	1996	Summer	F	3	–	1	4
Hyun-Soo Ahn	South Korea	Short-track speed skating	2006	Winter	M	3	–	1	4
Victor An (2)	Russia	Short-track speed skating	2014	Winter	M	3	–	1	4
Kaylee McKeown	Australia	Swimming	2020	Summer	F	3	–	1	4
Irene Schouten	Netherlands	Speed skating	2022	Winter	F	3	–	1	4
Bjørn Dæhlie (3)	Norway	Cross-country skiing	1994	Winter	M	2	2	–	4
Robert Garrett	United States	Athletics	1896	Summer	M	2	2	–	4
Alexander Popov	Russia	Swimming	1996	Summer	M	2	2	–	4
Alexander Popov (2)	Unified Team	Swimming	1992	Summer	M	2	2	–	4
Nadia Comăneci	Romania	Gymnastics	1980	Summer	F	2	2	–	4
Gary Hall Jr.	United States	Swimming	1996	Summer	M	2	2	–	4
Michael Klim	Australia	Swimming	2000	Summer	M	2	2	–	4
Michael Gross	West Germany	Swimming	1984	Summer	M	2	2	–	4
Simone Manuel	United States	Swimming	2016	Summer	F	2	2	–	4
Zhang Yufei	China	Swimming	2020	Summer	F	2	2	–	4
Katie Ledecky (2)	United States	Swimming	2020	Summer	F	2	2	–	4
Ariarne Titmus (2)	Australia	Swimming	2024	Summer	F	2	2	–	4
Akinori Nakayama	Japan	Gymnastics	1972	Summer	M	2	1	1	4
Gary Hall Jr. (2)	United States	Swimming	2000	Summer	M	2	1	1	4
Ludmilla Tourischeva (2)	Soviet Union	Gymnastics	1972	Summer	F	2	1	1	4
Gunde Svan	Sweden	Cross-country skiing	1984	Winter	M	2	1	1	4
Lisbeth Trickett	Australia	Swimming	2008	Summer	F	2	1	1	4
Ian Thorpe (2)	Australia	Swimming	2004	Summer	M	2	1	1	4
Sun Yang	China	Swimming	2012	Summer	M	2	1	1	4
Yelena Shushunova	Soviet Union	Gymnastics	1988	Summer	F	2	1	1	4
Svetlana Boginskaya	Soviet Union	Gymnastics	1988	Summer	F	2	1	1	4
Tatiana Gutsu	Unified Team	Gymnastics	1992	Summer	F	2	1	1	4
Lavinia Miloșovici	Romania	Gymnastics	1992	Summer	F	2	1	1	4
Maya DiRado	United States	Swimming	2016	Summer	F	2	1	1	4
Ariarne Titmus	Australia	Swimming	2020	Summer	F	2	1	1	4
Tarjei Bø	Norway	Biathlon	2022	Winter	M	2	1	1	4
Johannes Høsflot Klæbo	Norway	Cross-country skiing	2022	Winter	M	2	1	1	4
Suzanne Schulting	Netherlands	Short-track speed skating	2022	Winter	F	2	1	1	4
Pieter van den Hoogenband	Netherlands	Swimming	2000	Summer	M	2	–	2	4
Natalia Kuchinskaya	Soviet Union	Gymnastics	1968	Summer	F	2	–	2	4
Ryan Lochte (2)	United States	Swimming	2008	Summer	M	2	–	2	4
Nathan Adrian	United States	Swimming	2016	Summer	M	2	–	2	4
Kirsty Coventry	Zimbabwe	Swimming	2008	Summer	F	1	3	–	4
Shawn Johnson	United States	Gymnastics	2008	Summer	F	1	3	–	4
Charlotte Kalla	Sweden	Cross-country skiing	2018	Winter	F	1	3	–	4
Susie O'Neill	Australia	Swimming	2000	Summer	F	1	3	–	4
Duncan Scott	Great Britain	Swimming	2020	Summer	M	1	3	–	4
Miho Takagi	Japan	Speed skating	2022	Winter	F	1	3	–	4
Sixten Jernberg	Sweden	Cross-country skiing	1956	Winter	M	1	2	1	4
Ludmilla Tourischeva	Soviet Union	Gymnastics	1976	Summer	F	1	2	1	4
Emma McKeon (2)	Australia	Swimming	2016	Summer	F	1	2	1	4
Stina Nilsson	Sweden	Cross-country skiing	2018	Winter	F	1	2	1	4
Ágnes Keleti	Hungary	Gymnastics	1952	Summer	F	1	1	2	4
Inge de Bruijn (2)	Netherlands	Swimming	2004	Summer	F	1	1	2	4
Penny Oleksiak	Canada	Swimming	2016	Summer	F	1	1	2	4
Simona Amânar	Romania	Gymnastics	1996	Summer	F	1	1	2	4
Aliya Mustafina	Russia	Gymnastics	2012	Summer	F	1	1	2	4
Francis Gailey	United States	Swimming	1904	Summer	M	–	3	1	4
Alexander Bolshunov	Olympic Athletes from Russia	Cross-country skiing	2018	Winter	M	–	3	1	4
Franziska van Almsick	Germany	Swimming	1992	Summer	F	–	2	2	4
Teddy Billington	United States	Cycling	1904	Summer	M	–	1	3	4
Gina Gogean	Romania	Gymnastics	1996	Summer	F	–	1	3	4
Vitaly Scherbo (2)	Belarus	Gymnastics	1996	Summer	M	–	–	4	4

=== Timeline ===
The historical progression of the leading performance(s).

Total medals	Year	Record duration	Athlete	Nation	Sport	Games	Sex	Gold	Silver	Bronze
6	1896	1896–1920	Hermann Weingärtner	Germany	Gymnastics	Summer	M	3	2	1
6	1904	1904–1920	Anton Heida	United States	Gymnastics	Summer	M	5	1	0
7	1920	1920–1980	Willis A. Lee	United States	Shooting	Summer	M	5	1	1
7	1920	1920–1980	Lloyd Spooner	United States	Shooting	Summer	M	4	1	2
7	1972	1972–1980	Mark Spitz	United States	Swimming	Summer	M	7	0	0
8	1980	1980–present	Alexander Dityatin	Soviet Union	Gymnastics	Summer	M	3	4	1
8	2004	2004–present	Michael Phelps	United States	Swimming	Summer	M	6	0	2
8	2008	2008–present	Michael Phelps	United States	Swimming	Summer	M	8	0	0

== See also ==
- List of multiple Olympic medalists
- List of multiple Olympic medalists in one event
- List of multiple Olympic gold medalists
- List of multiple Olympic gold medalists at a single Games
- List of multiple Olympic gold medalists in one event
- List of multiple Summer Olympic medalists
- List of multiple Winter Olympic medalists
- All-time Olympic Games medal table
