= Birgit Radochla =

German gymnast

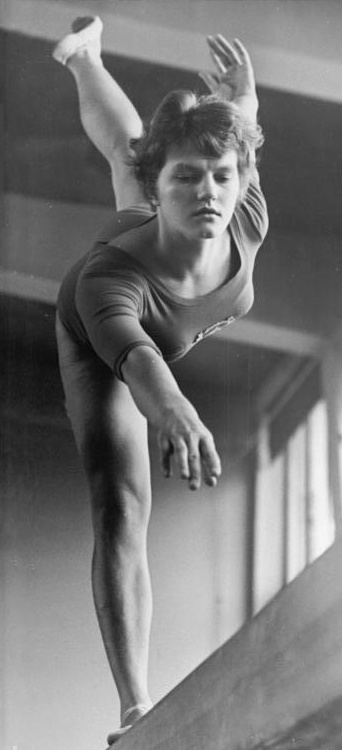
- Birgit Radochla in 1963

Personal information
- Born: 31 January 1945 (age 81) Döbern, Germany
- Height: 1.63 m (5 ft 4 in)
- Weight: 60 kg (130 lb)

Sport
- Sport: Artistic gymnastics
- Club: SC Dynamo Berlin
Medal record
Representing Germany
Olympic Games
Silver medal – second place	1964 Tokyo	Vault
Representing East Germany
European Championships
Silver medal – second place	1965 Sofia	Floor
Bronze medal – third place	1965 Sofia	Balance beam
Bronze medal – third place	1965 Sofia	All-around

Birgit Radochla (later Birgit Michailoff, born 31 January 1945) is a retired German gymnast. She competed at the 1964 Summer Olympics in all artistic gymnastics events and finished in fourth place with the German team. Individually she won a silver medal in the vault and finished fourth in the floor exercise and all-around. She also won three medals in individual events at the 1965 European championships.

Her father Helmut was a substitute gymnast for the German Olympic team in 1936, and in 1949 became the first champion of East Germany on pommel horse.

After retiring from competitions, she completed her training as a kindergarten teacher at the Fröbel-Institut Berlin-Köpenik in 1971 and then worked as a clerk at her club SC Dynamo Berlin. She later received two more degrees of beautician and sports coach via evening school and distance learning. She married Michail Michailoff, a Bulgarian engineer and researcher in electronics and later also sports journalist.

== Eponymous skill ==
Radochla has one eponymous skill listed in the Code of Points.

Apparatus	Name	Description	Difficulty (Note: Valid for the 2025-2028 Code of Points)
Uneven bars	Radochla	From inner front support on low bar - cast with salto roll forward to hang on high bar	D

== See also ==
- Media related to Birgit Radochla at Wikimedia Commons
