= Gymnastics at the 1904 Summer Olympics – Men's parallel bars =

Men's parallel bars at the Games of the III Olympiad
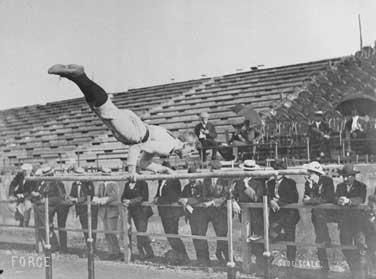
- Parallel bars competition during 1904 Games.
- Venue: Francis Olympic Field
- Dates: October 28, 1904
- Competitors: ? from ? nations
- Winning score: 44

Medalists
1st place, gold medalist(s)		George Eyser; United States
2nd place, silver medalist(s)		Anton Heida; United States
3rd place, bronze medalist(s)		John Duha; United States

The men's parallel bars was an artistic gymnastics event held as part of the gymnastics programme at the 1904 Summer Olympics. It was the second time the event was held at the Olympics. An unknown number of gymnasts competed, only five are known (all American). The competition was held on Friday, October 28, 1904. The event was won by George Eyser, with Anton Heida second and John Duha.

== Background ==
This was the second appearance of the event, which is one of the five apparatus events held every time there were apparatus events at the Summer Olympics (no apparatus events were held in 1900, 1908, 1912, or 1920).

== Competition format ==
Each gymnast performed three exercises on the parallel bars, all voluntary in design. Three judges each gave scores from 0 to 5 for each exercise; thus, the maximum for an exercise was 15 and the maximum total was 45.

== Schedule ==
Date	Time	Round
Friday, 28 October 1904		Final

== Results ==
Rank	Gymnast	Nation	Score
1st place, gold medalist(s)	George Eyser	United States	44
2nd place, silver medalist(s)	Anton Heida	United States	43
3rd place, bronze medalist(s)	John Duha	United States	40
4–5	Edward Hennig	United States	
4–5	William Merz	United States	

== Sources ==
- De Wael, Herman (2000). "Herman's Full Olympians".
- Wudarski, Pawel (1999). "Wyniki Igrzysk Olimpijskich" (in Polish).
