= Gymnastics at the 1904 Summer Olympics – Men's rings =

Men's rings at the Games of the III Olympiad
- Artistic gymnastics pictogram
- Venue: Francis Olympic Field
- Date: October 28, 1904
- Competitors: ? from ? nations
- Winning score: 45

Medalists
1st place, gold medalist(s)		Herman Glass; United States
2nd place, silver medalist(s)		William Merz; United States
3rd place, bronze medalist(s)		Emil Voigt; United States

The men's rings was an artistic gymnastics event held as part of the gymnastics programme at the 1904 Summer Olympics. It was the second time the event was held at the Olympics. An unknown number of gymnasts competed, only three are known. The competition was held on Friday, October 28, 1904. All three of the known competitors, the medalists, were American. The event was won by Herman Glass, with William Merz second and Emil Voigt third.

== Background ==
This was the second appearance of the event, which is one of the five apparatus events held every time there were apparatus events at the Summer Olympics (no apparatus events were held in 1900, 1908, 1912, or 1920).

== Competition format ==
Each gymnast performed three exercises on the rings, all voluntary in design. Three judges each gave scores from 0 to 5 for each exercise; thus, the maximum for an exercise was 15 and the maximum total was 45.

== Schedule ==
Date	Time	Round
Friday, 28 October 1904		Final

== Results ==
Rank	Gymnast	Nation	Score
1st place, gold medalist(s)	Herman Glass	United States	45
2nd place, silver medalist(s)	William Merz	United States	35
3rd place, bronze medalist(s)	Emil Voigt	United States	32

== Sources ==
- De Wael, Herman (2000). "Herman's Full Olympians".
- Wudarski, Pawel (1999). "Wyniki Igrzysk Olimpijskich" (in Polish).
