= Gymnastics at the 1904 Summer Olympics – Men's vault =

Men's vault at the Games of the III Olympiad
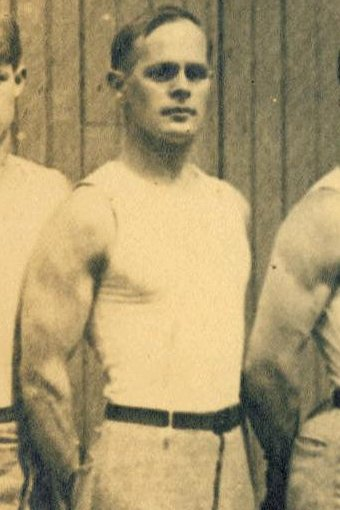
- George Eyser
- Venue: Francis Olympic Field
- Date: October 28, 1904
- Competitors: ? from ? nations
- Winning score: 36

Medalists
1st place, gold medalist(s)		George Eyser	United States
1st place, gold medalist(s)		Anton Heida	United States
3rd place, bronze medalist(s)		William Merz	United States

The men's vault was an artistic gymnastics event held as part of the gymnastics programme at the 1904 Summer Olympics. It was only the second time that the event was held at the Olympics. An unknown number of gymnasts competed, only five are known. The competition was held on Friday, October 28, 1904.

== Background ==
This was the second appearance of the event, which is one of the five apparatus events held every time there were apparatus events at the Summer Olympics (no apparatus events were held in 1900, 1908, 1912, or 1920). Little is known of who competed in this event, with only five Americans known and an unknown number of other gymnasts. The event was not held at the 1903 world championships. Anton Heida was the AAU champion in 1902.

== Competition format ==
The event used a "vaulting horse" aligned parallel to the gymnast's run (rather than the modern "vaulting table" in use since 2004). Each gymnast performed three vaults. For each vault, three judges each gave a score from 0 to 5. The scores were summed to give a final total. Thus, the maximum score per vault was 15 and the maximum overall score was 45.

== Schedule ==
Date	Time	Round
Friday, 28 October 1904		Final

== Results ==
Rank	Gymnast	Nation	Score
1st place, gold medalist(s)	George Eyser	United States	36
1st place, gold medalist(s)	Anton Heida	United States	36
3rd place, bronze medalist(s)	William Merz	United States	31
4–5	John Duha	United States	
4–5	Edward Hennig	United States	

== Sources ==
- De Wael, Herman (2000). "Herman's Full Olympians".
- Wudarski, Pawel (1999). "Wyniki Igrzysk Olimpijskich" (in Polish).
