= List of multiple Olympic gold medalists at a single Games =

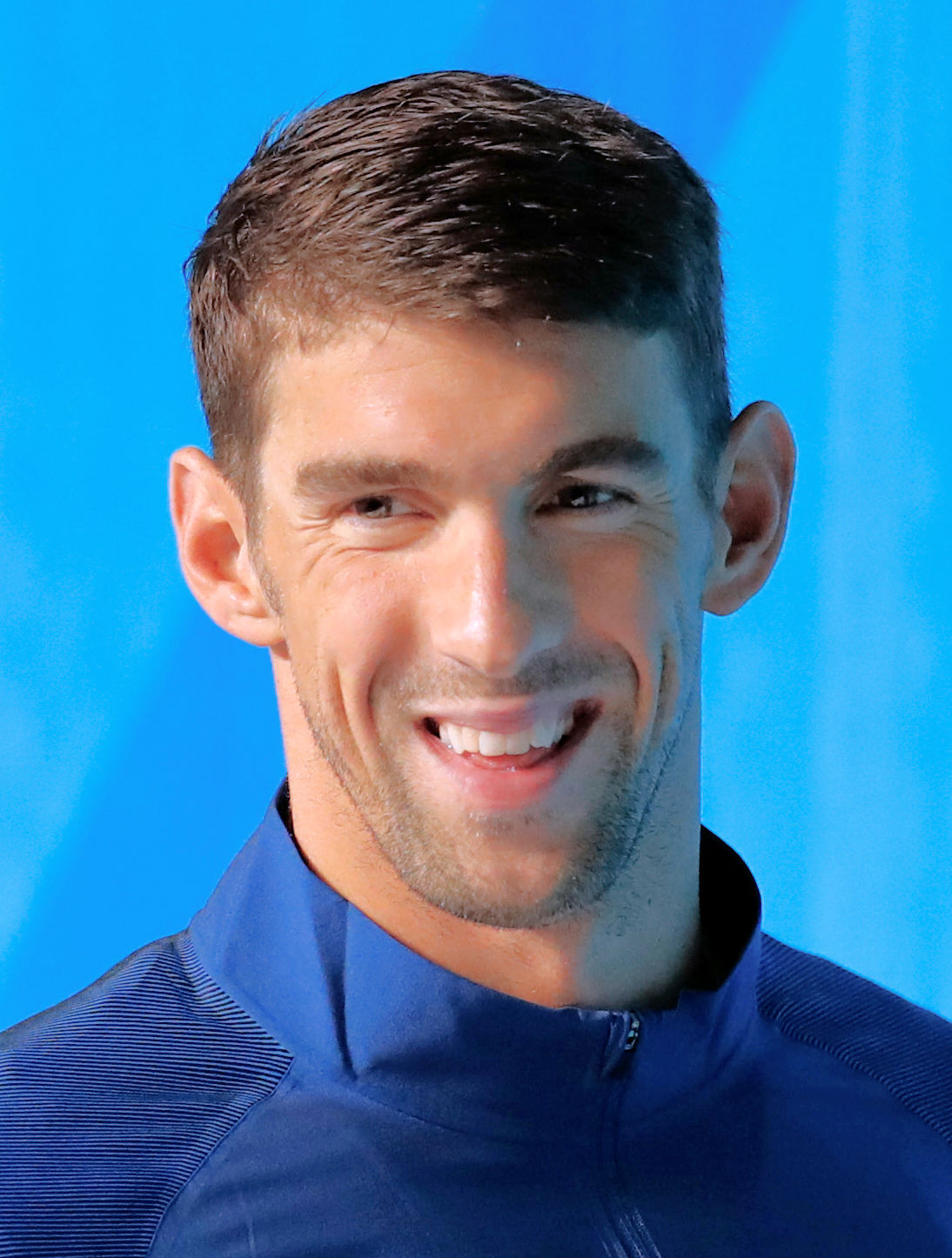
Michael Phelps has won the most gold medals at a single Olympics, winning 8 gold medals in 2008

This is a list of athletes who have won multiple gold medals at a single Olympic Games.

== List of most gold medals won at a single Olympic Games ==
This is a list of most gold medals won in a single Olympic Games. Medals won in the 1906 Intercalated Games are not included. It includes top-three placings in 1896 and 1900, before medals were awarded for top-three placings.

Rank	Athlete	Nation	Sport	Year	Game	Sex	Gold medal	Silver medal	Bronze medal	
1	Michael Phelps	United States	Swimming	2008	Summer	M	8	0	0	8
2	Mark Spitz	United States	Swimming	1972	Summer	M	7	0	0	7
3	Michael Phelps	United States	Swimming	2004	Summer	M	6	0	2	8
4	Kristin Otto	East Germany	Swimming	1988	Summer	F	6	0	0	6
4	Vitaly Scherbo	Unified Team	Gymnastics	1992	Summer	M	6	0	0	6
4	Johannes Høsflot Klæbo	Norway	Cross-country skiing	2026	Winter	M	6	0	0	6
7	Willis A. Lee	United States	Shooting	1920	Summer	M	5	1	1	7
7	Matt Biondi	United States	Swimming	1988	Summer	M	5	1	1	7
9	Anton Heida	United States	Gymnastics	1904	Summer	M	5	1	0	6
9	Michael Phelps	United States	Swimming	2016	Summer	M	5	1	0	6
11	Nedo Nadi	Italy	Fencing	1920	Summer	M	5	0	0	5
11	Paavo Nurmi	Finland	Athletics	1924	Summer	M	5	0	0	5
11	Eric Heiden	United States	Speed skating	1980	Winter	M	5	0	0	5
11	Caeleb Dressel	United States	Swimming	2020	Summer	M	5	0	0	5
15	Boris Shakhlin	Soviet Union	Gymnastics	1960	Summer	M	4	2	1	7
15	Nikolai Andrianov	Soviet Union	Gymnastics	1976	Summer	M	4	2	1	7
17	Hubert Van Innis	Belgium	Archery	1920	Summer	M	4	2	0	6
17	Ville Ritola	Finland	Athletics	1924	Summer	M	4	2	0	6
17	Viktor Chukarin	Soviet Union	Gymnastics	1952	Summer	M	4	2	0	6
17	Ágnes Keleti	Hungary	Gymnastics	1956	Summer	F	4	2	0	6
17	Věra Čáslavská	Czechoslovakia	Gymnastics	1968	Summer	F	4	2	0	6
17	Michael Phelps	United States	Swimming	2012	Summer	M	4	2	0	6
23	Lloyd Spooner	United States	Shooting	1920	Summer	M	4	1	2	7
24	Carl Osburn	United States	Shooting	1920	Summer	M	4	1	1	6
24	Larisa Latynina	Soviet Union	Gymnastics	1956	Summer	F	4	1	1	6
24	Akinori Nakayama	Japan	Gymnastics	1968	Summer	M	4	1	1	6
27	Kornelia Ender	East Germany	Swimming	1976	Summer	F	4	1	0	5
27	John Naber	United States	Swimming	1976	Summer	M	4	1	0	5
27	Ecaterina Szabo	Romania	Gymnastics	1984	Summer	F	4	1	0	5
27	Vladimir Artemov	Soviet Union	Gymnastics	1988	Summer	M	4	1	0	5
27	Katie Ledecky	United States	Swimming	2016	Summer	F	4	1	0	5
32	Emma McKeon	Australia	Swimming	2020	Summer	F	4	0	3	7
33	Marcus Hurley	United States	Cycling	1904	Summer	M	4	0	1	5
33	Missy Franklin	United States	Swimming	2012	Summer	F	4	0	1	5
33	Simone Biles	United States	Gymnastics	2016	Summer	F	4	0	1	5
33	Johannes Thingnes Bø	Norway	Biathlon	2022	Winter	M	4	0	1	5
33	Léon Marchand	France	Swimming	2024	Summer	M	4	0	1	5
38	Carl Schuhmann	Germany	Gymnastics, Wrestling	1896	Summer	M	4	0	0	4
38	Alvin Kraenzlein	United States	Athletics	1900	Summer	M	4	0	0	4
38	Jesse Owens	United States	Athletics	1936	Summer	M	4	0	0	4
38	Fanny Blankers-Koen	Netherlands	Athletics	1948	Summer	F	4	0	0	4
38	Lidiya Skoblikova	Soviet Union	Speed skating	1964	Winter	F	4	0	0	4
38	Don Schollander	United States	Swimming	1964	Summer	M	4	0	0	4
38	Carl Lewis	United States	Athletics	1984	Summer	M	4	0	0	4
38	Amy Van Dyken	United States	Swimming	1996	Summer	F	4	0	0	4
38	Ole Einar Bjørndalen	Norway	Biathlon	2002	Winter	M	4	0	0	4
47	Alexander Dityatin	Soviet Union	Gymnastics	1980	Summer	M	3	4	1	8
48	Hermann Weingärtner	Germany	Gymnastics	1896	Summer	M	3	2	1	6
48	George Eyser	United States	Gymnastics	1904	Summer	M	3	2	1	6
48	Larisa Latynina	Soviet Union	Gymnastics	1960	Summer	F	3	2	1	6
48	Li Ning	China	Gymnastics	1984	Summer	M	3	2	1	6
48	Daniela Silivaş	Romania	Gymnastics	1988	Summer	F	3	2	1	6
53	Vilhelm Carlberg	Sweden	Shooting	1912	Summer	M	3	2	0	5
53	Otto Olsen	Norway	Shooting	1920	Summer	M	3	2	0	5
53	Roger Ducret	France	Fencing	1924	Summer	M	3	2	0	5
53	Sawao Kato	Japan	Gymnastics	1972	Summer	M	3	2	0	5
53	Lyubov Yegorova	Unified Team	Cross-country skiing	1992	Winter	F	3	2	0	5
53	Ian Thorpe	Australia	Swimming	2000	Summer	M	3	2	0	5
53	Torri Huske	United States	Swimming	2024	Summer	F	3	2	0	5
60	Konrad Frey	Germany	Gymnastics	1936	Summer	M	3	1	2	6
60	Takashi Ono	Japan	Gymnastics	1960	Summer	M	3	1	2	6
62	Charles Daniels	United States	Swimming	1904	Summer	M	3	1	1	5
62	Clas Thunberg	Finland	Speed skating	1924	Winter	M	3	1	1	5
62	Veikko Huhtanen	Finland	Gymnastics	1948	Summer	M	3	1	1	5
62	Viktor Chukarin	Soviet Union	Gymnastics	1956	Summer	M	3	1	1	5
62	Shane Gould	Australia	Swimming	1972	Summer	F	3	1	1	5
62	Nadia Comaneci	Romania	Gymnastics	1976	Summer	F	3	1	1	5
62	Larisa Lazutina	Russia	Cross-country skiing	1998	Winter	F	3	1	1	5
62	Marit Bjørgen	Norway	Cross-country skiing	2010	Winter	F	3	1	1	5
62	Allison Schmitt	United States	Swimming	2012	Summer	F	3	1	1	5
62	Alexander Bolshunov	ROC	Cross-country skiing	2022	Winter	M	3	1	1	5
62	Mollie O'Callaghan	Australia	Swimming	2024	Summer	F	3	1	1	5
73	Rie Mastenbroek	Netherlands	Swimming	1936	Summer	F	3	1	0	4
73	Hannes Kolehmainen	Finland	Athletics	1912	Summer	M	3	1	0	4
73	Paavo Nurmi	Finland	Athletics	1920	Summer	M	3	1	0	4
73	Georges Miez	Switzerland	Gymnastics	1928	Summer	M	3	1	0	4
73	Ivar Ballangrud	Norway	Speed skating	1936	Winter	M	3	1	0	4
73	Věra Čáslavská	Czechoslovakia	Gymnastics	1964	Summer	F	3	1	0	4
73	Yukio Endo	Japan	Gymnastics	1964	Summer	M	3	1	0	4
73	Charlie Hickcox	United States	Swimming	1968	Summer	M	3	1	0	4
73	Olga Korbut	Soviet Union	Gymnastics	1972	Summer	F	3	1	0	4
73	Nellie Kim	Soviet Union	Gymnastics	1976	Summer	F	3	1	0	4
73	Florence Griffith-Joyner	United States	Athletics	1988	Summer	F	3	1	0	4
73	Bjørn Dæhlie	Norway	Cross-country skiing	1992	Winter	M	3	1	0	4
73	Vegard Ulvang	Norway	Cross-country skiing	1992	Winter	M	3	1	0	4
73	Lyubov Yegorova	Russia	Cross-country skiing	1994	Winter	F	3	1	0	4
73	Bjørn Dæhlie	Norway	Cross-country skiing	1998	Winter	M	3	1	0	4
73	Inge de Bruijn	Netherlands	Swimming	2000	Summer	F	3	1	0	4
73	Leontien van Moorsel	Netherlands	Cycling	2000	Summer	F	3	1	0	4
73	Janica Kostelić	Croatia	Alpine skiing	2002	Winter	F	3	1	0	4
73	Petria Thomas	Australia	Swimming	2004	Summer	F	3	1	0	4
73	Katinka Hosszú	Hungary	Swimming	2016	Summer	F	3	1	0	4
73	Summer McIntosh	Canada	Swimming	2024	Summer	F	3	1	0	4
73	Simone Biles	United States	Gymnastics	2024	Summer	F	3	1	0	4
73	Julia Simon	France	Biathlon	2026	Winter	F	3	1	0	4
95	Marte Olsbu Røiseland	Norway	Biathlon	2022	Winter	F	3	0	2	5
96	Johnny Weissmuller	United States	Swimming	1924	Summer	M	3	0	1	4
96	Paavo Aaltonen	Finland	Gymnastics	1948	Summer	M	3	0	1	4
96	Sawao Kato	Japan	Gymnastics	1968	Summer	M	3	0	1	4
96	Jim Montgomery	United States	Swimming	1976	Summer	M	3	0	1	4
96	Marja-Liisa Hämäläinen	Finland	Cross-country skiing	1984	Winter	F	3	0	1	4
96	Dmitry Bilozerchev	Soviet Union	Gymnastics	1988	Summer	M	3	0	1	4
96	Michelle Smith	Ireland	Swimming	1996	Summer	F	3	0	1	4
96	Jenny Thompson	United States	Swimming	2000	Summer	F	3	0	1	4
96	Ahn Hyun-Soo	South Korea	Short track speed skating	2006	Winter	M	3	0	1	4
96	Victor Ahn	Russia	Short track speed skating	2014	Winter	M	3	0	1	4
96	Kaylee McKeown	Australia	Swimming	2020	Summer	F	3	0	1	4
96	Irene Schouten	Netherlands	Speed skating	2022	Winter	F	3	0	1	4
96	Shinnosuke Oka	Japan	Gymnastics	2024	Summer	M	3	0	1	4
96	Quentin Fillon Maillet	France	Biathlon	2026	Winter	M	3	0	1	4
96	Jens van 't Wout	Netherlands	Short track speed skating	2026	Winter	M	3	0	1	4
111	Paul Masson	France	Cycling	1896	Summer	M	3	0	0	3
111	Ray Ewry	United States	Athletics	1900	Summer	M	3	0	0	3
111	Ray Ewry	United States	Athletics	1904	Summer	M	3	0	0	3
111	Archie Hahn	United States	Athletics	1904	Summer	M	3	0	0	3
111	Mel Sheppard	United States	Athletics	1908	Summer	M	3	0	0	3
111	Henry Taylor	Great Britain	Swimming	1908	Summer	M	3	0	0	3
111	Alfred Lane	United States	Shooting	1912	Summer	M	3	0	0	3
111	Morris Fisher	United States	Shooting	1920	Summer	M	3	0	0	3
111	Ole Lilloe-Olsen	Norway	Shooting	1920	Summer	M	3	0	0	3
111	Norman Ross	United States	Swimming	1920	Summer	M	3	0	0	3
111	Thorleif Haug	Norway	Cross-country skiing & Nordic combined	1924	Winter	M	3	0	0	3
111	Hjalmar Andersen	Norway	Speed skating	1952	Winter	M	3	0	0	3
111	Emil Zátopek	Czechoslovakia	Athletics	1952	Summer	M	3	0	0	3
111	Toni Sailer	Austria	Alpine skiing	1956	Winter	M	3	0	0	3
111	Betty Cuthbert	Australia	Athletics	1956	Summer	M	3	0	0	3
111	Bobby Morrow	United States	Athletics	1956	Summer	M	3	0	0	3
111	Murray Rose	Australia	Swimming	1956	Summer	M	3	0	0	3
111	Wilma Rudolph	United States	Athletics	1960	Summer	F	3	0	0	3
111	Klavdiya Boyarskikh	Soviet Union	Cross-country skiing	1964	Winter	F	3	0	0	3
111	Steve Clark	United States	Swimming	1964	Summer	M	3	0	0	3
111	Jean-Claude Killy	France	Alpine skiing	1968	Winter	M	3	0	0	3
111	Debbie Meyer	United States	Swimming	1968	Summer	M	3	0	0	3
111	Galina Kulakova	Soviet Union	Cross-country skiing	1972	Winter	F	3	0	0	3
111	Ard Schenk	Netherlands	Speed skating	1972	Winter	M	3	0	0	3
111	Sandy Neilson	United States	Swimming	1972	Summer	F	3	0	0	3
111	Nikolay Zimyatov	Soviet Union	Cross-country skiing	1976	Winter	M	3	0	0	3
111	Vladimir Salnikov	Soviet Union	Swimming	1980	Summer	M	3	0	0	3
111	Valerie Brisco-Hooks	United States	Athletics	1984	Summer	F	3	0	0	3
111	Rick Carey	United States	Swimming	1984	Summer	M	3	0	0	3
111	Tracy Caulkins	United States	Swimming	1984	Summer	F	3	0	0	3
111	Ian Ferguson	New Zealand	Canoeing	1984	Summer	M	3	0	0	3
111	Rowdy Gaines	United States	Swimming	1984	Summer	M	3	0	0	3
111	Mary Meagher	United States	Swimming	1984	Summer	F	3	0	0	3
111	Matti Nykänen	Finland	Ski jumping	1988	Winter	M	3	0	0	3
111	Yvonne van Gennip	Netherlands	Speed skating	1988	Winter	F	3	0	0	3
111	Janet Evans	United States	Swimming	1988	Summer	F	3	0	0	3
111	Krisztina Egerszegi	Hungary	Swimming	1992	Summer	F	3	0	0	3
111	Yevgeny Sadovyi	Unified Team	Swimming	1992	Summer	M	3	0	0	3
111	Johann Olav Koss	Norway	Speed skating	1994	Winter	M	3	0	0	3
111	Josh Davis	United States	Swimming	1996	Summer	M	3	0	0	3
111	Jenny Thompson	United States	Swimming	1996	Summer	F	3	0	0	3
111	Lenny Krayzelburg	United States	Swimming	2000	Summer	M	3	0	0	3
111	Samppa Lajunen	Finland	Nordic combined	2002	Winter	M	3	0	0	3
111	Jodie Henry	Australia	Swimming	2004	Summer	F	3	0	0	3
111	Aaron Peirsol	United States	Swimming	2004	Summer	M	3	0	0	3
111	Cătălina Ponor	Romania	Gymnastics	2004	Summer	F	3	0	0	3
111	Michael Greis	Germany	Biathlon	2006	Winter	M	3	0	0	3
111	Jin Sun-Yu	South Korea	Short track speed skating	2006	Winter	F	3	0	0	3
111	Chris Hoy	Great Britain	Cycling	2008	Summer	M	3	0	0	3
111	Zou Kai	China	Gymnastics	2008	Summer	M	3	0	0	3
111	Stephanie Rice	Australia	Swimming	2008	Summer	F	3	0	0	3
111	Wang Meng	China	Short track speed skating	2010	Winter	F	3	0	0	3
111	Usain Bolt	Jamaica	Athletics	2012	Summer	M	3	0	0	3
111	Allyson Felix	United States	Athletics	2012	Summer	F	3	0	0	3
111	Dana Vollmer	United States	Swimming	2012	Summer	F	3	0	0	3
111	Marit Bjørgen	Norway	Cross-country skiing	2014	Winter	F	3	0	0	3
111	Darya Domracheva	Belarus	Biathlon	2014	Winter	F	3	0	0	3
111	Usain Bolt	Jamaica	Athletics	2016	Summer	M	3	0	0	3
111	Jason Kenny	Great Britain	Cycling	2016	Summer	M	3	0	0	3
111	Danuta Kozák	Hungary	Canoeing	2016	Summer	F	3	0	0	3
111	Ryan Murphy	United States	Swimming	2016	Summer	M	3	0	0	3
111	Martin Fourcade	France	Biathlon	2018	Winter	M	3	0	0	3
111	Johannes Høsflot Klæbo	Norway	Cross-country skiing	2018	Winter	M	3	0	0	3
111	An San	South Korea	Archery	2020	Summer	F	3	0	0	3
111	Lisa Carrington	New Zealand	Canoeing	2020	Summer	F	3	0	0	3
111	Elaine Thompson-Herah	Jamaica	Athletics	2020	Summer	F	3	0	0	3
111	Therese Johaug	Norway	Cross-country skiing	2022	Winter	F	3	0	0	3
111	Lisa Carrington	New Zealand	Canoeing	2024	Summer	F	3	0	0	3
111	Harrie Lavreysen	Netherlands	Cycling	2024	Summer	M	3	0	0	3
111	Lim Si-hyeon	South Korea	Archery	2024	Summer	F	3	0	0	3
111	Kim Woo-jin	South Korea	Archery	2024	Summer	M	3	0	0	3
111	Gabrielle Thomas	United States	Athletics	2024	Summer	F	3	0	0	3
111	Franjo von Allmen	Switzerland	Alpine skiing	2026	Winter	M	3	0	0	3
111	Jens Lurås Oftebro	Norway	Nordic combined	2026	Winter	M	3	0	0	3
185	Ireen Wüst	Netherlands	Speed skating	2014	Winter	F	2	3	0	5
185	Quentin Fillon Maillet	France	Biathlon	2022	Winter	M	2	3	0	5
185	Regan Smith	United States	Swimming	2024	Summer	F	2	3	0	5
188	Larisa Latynina	Soviet Union	Gymnastics	1964	Summer	F	2	2	2	6
189	Walter Tewksbury	United States	Athletics	1900	Summer	M	2	2	1	5
189	Nikolai Andrianov	Soviet Union	Gymnastics	1980	Summer	M	2	2	1	5
189	Manuela Di Centa	Italy	Cross-country skiing	1994	Winter	F	2	2	1	5
189	Natalie Coughlin	United States	Swimming	2004	Summer	F	2	2	1	5
189	Ryan Lochte	United States	Swimming	2012	Summer	M	2	2	1	5
194	Edoardo Mangiarotti	Italy	Fencing	1952	Summer	M	2	2	0	4
194	Nadia Comaneci	Romania	Gymnastics	1980	Summer	F	2	2	0	4
194	Karin Enke	East Germany	Speed skating	1984	Winter	F	2	2	0	4
194	Michael Gross	West Germany	Swimming	1984	Summer	M	2	2	0	4
194	Alexander Popov	Unified Team	Swimming	1992	Summer	M	2	2	0	4
194	Bjørn Dæhlie	Norway	Cross-country skiing	1994	Winter	M	2	2	0	4
194	Gary Hall, Jr.	United States	Swimming	1996	Summer	M	2	2	0	4
194	Alexander Popov	Russia	Swimming	1996	Summer	M	2	2	0	4
194	Simone Manuel	United States	Swimming	2016	Summer	F	2	2	0	4
194	Zhang Yufei	China	Swimming	2020	Summer	F	2	2	0	4
194	Katie Ledecky	United States	Swimming	2020	Summer	F	2	2	0	4
194	Ariarne Titmus	Australia	Swimming	2024	Summer	F	2	2	0	4
194	Kate Douglass	United States	Swimming	2024	Summer	F	2	2	0	4
194	Gretchen Walsh	United States	Swimming	2024	Summer	F	2	2	0	4
208	Alexei Nemov	Russia	Gymnastics	1996	Summer	M	2	1	3	6
208	Alexei Nemov	Russia	Gymnastics	2000	Summer	M	2	1	3	6
210	Mitsuo Tsukahara	Japan	Gymnastics	1976	Summer	M	2	1	2	5
210	Koji Gushiken	Japan	Gymnastics	1984	Summer	M	2	1	2	5
210	Svetlana Boginskaya	Soviet Union	Gymnastics	1988	Summer	F	2	1	2	5
210	Yelena Shushunova	Soviet Union	Gymnastics	1988	Summer	F	2	1	2	5
210	Marit Bjørgen	Norway	Cross-country skiing	2018	Winter	F	2	1	2	5
210	Kalyee McKeown	Australia	Swimming	2024	Summer	F	2	1	2	5
216	Polina Astakhova	Soviet Union	Gymnastics	1960	Summer	F	2	1	1	4
216	Polina Astakhova	Soviet Union	Gymnastics	1964	Summer	F	2	1	1	4
216	Mark Spitz	United States	Swimming	1968	Summer	M	2	1	1	4
216	Michael Wenden	Australia	Swimming	1968	Summer	M	2	1	1	4
216	Jerry Heidenreich	United States	Swimming	1972	Summer	M	2	1	1	4
216	Roland Matthes	East Germany	Swimming	1972	Summer	M	2	1	1	4
216	Akinori Nakayama	Japan	Gymnastics	1972	Summer	M	2	1	1	4
216	Ludmilla Tourischeva	Soviet Union	Gymnastics	1972	Summer	F	2	1	1	4
216	Gunde Svan	Sweden	Cross-country skiing	1984	Winter	M	2	1	1	4
216	Lavinia Miloşovici	Romania	Gymnastics	1992	Summer	F	2	1	1	4
216	Gary Hall, Jr.	United States	Swimming	2000	Summer	M	2	1	1	4
216	Ian Thorpe	Australia	Swimming	2004	Summer	M	2	1	1	4
216	Lisbeth Trickett	Australia	Swimming	2008	Summer	F	2	1	1	4
216	Petter Northug	Norway	Cross-country skiing	2010	Winter	M	2	1	1	4
216	Sun Yang	China	Swimming	2012	Summer	M	2	1	1	4
216	Maya DiRado	United States	Swimming	2016	Summer	F	2	1	1	4
216	Ariarne Titmus	Australia	Swimming	2020	Summer	F	2	1	1	4
216	Tarjei Bø	Norway	Biathlon	2022	Winter	M	2	1	1	4
216	Johannes Høsflot Klæbo	Norway	Cross-country skiing	2022	Winter	M	2	1	1	4
216	Suzanne Schulting	Netherlands	Short track speed skating	2022	Winter	F	2	1	1	4
216	Katie Ledecky	United States	Swimming	2024	Summer	F	2	1	1	4
216	Lou Jeanmonnot	France	Biathlon	2026	Winter	F	2	1	1	4
238	Meyer Prinstein	United States	Athletics	1900	Summer	M	2	1	0	3
238	Hubert Van Innis	Belgium	Archery	1900	Summer	M	2	1	0	3
238	Ole Lilloe-Olsen	Norway	Shooting	1924	Summer	M	2	1	0	3
238	Lucien Gaudin	France	Fencing	1928	Summer	M	2	1	0	3
238	Jimmy McLane	United States	Swimming	1948	Summer	M	2	1	0	3
238	Ford Konno	United States	Swimming	1952	Summer	M	2	1	0	3
238	Dawn Fraser	Australia	Swimming	1956	Summer	M	2	1	0	3
238	Eero Mäntyranta	Finland	Cross-country skiing	1964	Winter	M	2	1	0	3
238	Toini Gustafsson	Sweden	Cross-country skiing	1968	Winter	M	2	1	0	3
238	Roland Matthes	East Germany	Swimming	1968	Summer	M	2	1	0	3
238	Ken Walsh	United States	Swimming	1968	Summer	M	2	1	0	3
238	Rosi Mittermaier	Germany	Alpine skiing	1976	Winter	F	2	1	0	3
238	Raisa Smetanina	Soviet Union	Cross-country skiing	1976	Winter	F	2	1	0	3
238	John Hencken	United States	Swimming	1976	Summer	M	2	1	0	3
238	Sawao Kato	Japan	Gymnastics	1976	Summer	M	2	1	0	3
238	Hanni Wenzel	Liechtenstein	Alpine skiing	1980	Winter	F	2	1	0	3
238	Anatoly Alyabyev	Soviet Union	Biathlon	1980	Winter	M	2	1	0	3
238	Agneta Andersson	Sweden	Canoeing	1984	Summer	F	2	1	0	3
238	Mike Heath	United States	Swimming	1984	Summer	M	2	1	0	3
238	Peter Vidmar	United States	Gymnastics	1984	Summer	M	2	1	0	3
238	Chris Jacobs	United States	Swimming	1988	Summer	M	2	1	0	3
238	Tom Jager	United States	Swimming	1988	Summer	M	2	1	0	3
238	Carl Lewis	United States	Athletics	1988	Summer	M	2	1	0	3
238	Birgit Schmidt	East Germany	Canoeing	1988	Summer	F	2	1	0	3
238	Gunda Niemann-Stirnemann	Germany	Speed skating	1992	Winter	F	2	1	0	3
238	Mark Kirchner	Germany	Biathlon	1992	Winter	M	2	1	0	3
238	Matt Biondi	United States	Swimming	1992	Summer	M	2	1	0	3
238	Jenny Thompson	United States	Swimming	1992	Summer	F	2	1	0	4
238	Gwen Torrence	United States	Athletics	1992	Summer	F	2	1	0	3
238	Denis Pankratov	Russia	Swimming	1996	Summer	M	2	1	0	3
238	Lilia Podkopayeva	Ukraine	Gymnastics	1996	Summer	F	2	1	0	3
238	Olga Danilova	Russia	Cross-country skiing	1998	Winter	F	2	1	0	3
238	Kazuyoshi Funaki	Japan	Ski jumping	1998	Winter	M	2	1	0	3
238	Elena Zamolodchikova	Russia	Gymnastics	2000	Summer	F	2	1	0	3
238	Jochem Uytdehaage	Netherlands	Speed skating	2002	Winter	M	2	1	0	3
238	Kati Wilhelm	Germany	Biathlon	2002	Winter	F	2	1	0	3
238	Frode Estil	Norway	Cross-country skiing	2002	Winter	M	2	1	0	3
238	Yang Yang (b. 1976)	China	Short track speed skating	2002	Winter	F	2	1	0	3
238	Felix Gottwald	Austria	Nordic combined	2006	Winter	M	2	1	0	3
238	Matt Grevers	United States	Swimming	2008	Summer	M	2	1	0	3
238	Aaron Peirsol	United States	Swimming	2008	Summer	M	2	1	0	3
238	Yang Wei	China	Gymnastics	2008	Summer	M	2	1	0	3
238	Magdalena Neuner	Germany	Biathlon	2010	Winter	F	2	1	0	3
238	Emil Hegle Svendsen	Norway	Biathlon	2010	Winter	M	2	1	0	3
238	Lee Jung-Su	South Korea	Short track speed skating	2010	Winter	M	2	1	0	3
238	Nathan Adrian	United States	Swimming	2012	Summer	M	2	1	0	3
238	Matt Grevers	United States	Swimming	2012	Summer	M	2	1	0	3
238	Ranomi Kromowidjojo	Netherlands	Swimming	2012	Summer	F	2	1	0	3
238	Martin Fourcade	France	Biathlon	2014	Winter	M	2	1	0	3
238	Sven Kramer	Netherlands	Speed skating	2014	Winter	M	2	1	0	3
238	Allyson Felix	United States	Athletics	2016	Summer	F	2	1	0	3
238	Elaine Thompson	Jamaica	Athletics	2016	Summer	F	2	1	0	3
238	Simen Hegstad Krüger	Norway	Cross-country skiing	2018	Winter	M	2	1	0	3
238	Martin Johnsrud Sundby	Norway	Cross-country skiing	2018	Winter	M	2	1	0	3
238	James Guy	Great Britain	Swimming	2020	Summer	M	2	1	0	3
238	Adam Peaty	Great Britain	Swimming	2020	Summer	M	2	1	0	3
238	Evgeny Rylov	ROC	Swimming	2020	Summer	M	2	1	0	3
238	Vitalina Batsarashkina	ROC	Shooting	2020	Summer	F	2	1	0	3
238	Daiki Hashimoto	Japan	Gymnastics	2020	Summer	M	2	1	0	3
238	Jørgen Gråbak	Norway	Nordic combined	2022	Winter	M	2	1	0	3
238	Eileen Gu	China	Freestyle skiing	2022	Winter	F	2	1	0	3
238	Johannes Strolz	Austria	Alpine skiing	2022	Winter	M	2	1	0	3
238	Sun Yinsha	China	Table tennis	2024	Summer	M	2	1	0	3
238	Pan Zhanle	China	Swimming	2024	Summer	M	2	1	0	3
238	Caeleb Dressel	United States	Swimming	2024	Summer	M	2	1	0	3
238	Ellesse Andrews	New Zealand	Cycling	2024	Summer	F	2	1	0	3
238	Eric Perrot	France	Biathlon	2026	Winter	M	2	1	0	3
238	Anna Odine Strøm	Norway	Ski jumping	2026	Winter	F	2	1	0	3
238	Frida Karlsson	Sweden	Cross-country skiing	2026	Winter	F	2	1	0	3
238	Jordan Stolz	United States	Speed skating	2026	Winter	M	2	1	0	3
238	Océane Michelon	France	Biathlon	2026	Winter	F	2	1	0	3
308	Dara Torres	United States	Swimming	2000	Summer	F	2	0	3	5
309	Natalia Kuchinskaya	Soviet Union	Gymnastics	1968	Summer	F	2	0	2	4
309	Tatyana Averina	Soviet Union	Speed skating	1976	Winter	F	2	0	2	4
309	Natalia Shaposhnikova	Soviet Union	Gymnastics	1980	Summer	F	2	0	2	4
309	Pieter van den Hoogenband	Netherlands	Swimming	2000	Summer	M	2	0	2	4
309	Ryan Lochte	United States	Swimming	2008	Summer	M	2	0	2	4
309	Nathan Adrian	United States	Swimming	2016	Summer	M	2	0	2	4
315	Reginald Doherty	Great Britain	Tennis	1900	Summer	M	2	0	1	3
315	Martin Sheridan	United States	Athletics	1908	Summer	M	2	0	1	3
315	Alfred Lane	United States	Shooting	1920	Summer	M	2	0	1	3
315	Einar Liberg	Norway	Shooting	1920	Summer	M	2	0	1	3
315	Henri Oreiller	France	Alpine skiing	1948	Winter	M	2	0	1	3
315	Mal Whitfield	United States	Athletics	1948	Summer	M	2	0	1	3
315	Edoardo Mangiarotti	Italy	Fencing	1956	Summer	M	2	0	1	3
315	Sixten Jernberg	Sweden	Cross-country skiing	1964	Winter	M	2	0	1	3
315	Vyacheslav Vedenin	Soviet Union	Cross-country skiing	1972	Winter	M	2	0	1	3
315	Mitsuo Tsukahara	Japan	Gymnastics	1972	Summer	M	2	0	1	3
315	Larisa Petrik	Soviet Union	Gymnastics	1968	Summer	F	2	0	1	3
315	Yelena Davydova	Soviet Union	Gymnastics	1980	Summer	F	2	0	1	3
315	Gaetan Boucher	Canada	Speed skating	1984	Winter	M	2	0	1	3
315	Toni Nieminen	Finland	Ski jumping	1992	Winter	M	2	0	1	3
315	Jon Olsen	United States	Swimming	1992	Summer	M	2	0	1	3
315	Melvin Stewart	United States	Swimming	1992	Summer	M	2	0	1	3
315	Chun Lee-Kyung	South Korea	Short track speed skating	1998	Winter	F	2	0	1	3
315	Katja Seizinger	Germany	Alpine skiing	1998	Winter	F	2	0	1	3
315	Simona Amânar	Romania	Gymnastics	2000	Summer	F	2	0	1	3
315	Marc Gagnon	Canada	Short track speed skating	2002	Winter	M	2	0	1	3
315	Veronica Campbell-Brown	Jamaica	Athletics	2004	Summer	F	2	0	1	3
315	Kosuke Kitajima	Japan	Swimming	2004	Summer	M	2	0	1	3
315	Enrico Fabris	Italy	Speed skating	2006	Winter	M	2	0	1	3
315	Sven Fischer	Germany	Biathlon	2006	Winter	M	2	0	1	3
315	Kosuke Kitajima	Japan	Swimming	2008	Summer	M	2	0	1	3
315	Jason Lezak	United States	Swimming	2008	Summer	M	2	0	1	3
315	Martina Sáblíková	Czech Republic	Speed skating	2010	Winter	F	2	0	1	3
315	Zou Kai	China	Gymnastics	2012	Summer	M	2	0	1	3
315	Aly Raisman	United States	Gymnastics	2012	Summer	F	2	0	1	3
315	Max Whitlock	Great Britain	Gymnastics	2016	Summer	M	2	0	1	3
315	Eric Frenzel	Germany	Nordic combined	2018	Winter	M	2	0	1	3
315	Laura Dahlmeier	Germany	Biathlon	2018	Winter	F	2	0	1	3
315	Cate Campbell	Australia	Swimming	2020	Summer	F	2	0	1	3
315	Mollie O'Callaghan	Australia	Swimming	2020	Summer	F	2	0	1	3
315	Sifan Hassan	Netherlands	Athletics	2020	Summer	F	2	0	1	3
315	Harrie Lavreysen	Netherlands	Cycling	2020	Summer	M	2	0	1	3
315	Kim Gil-li	South Korea	Short track speed skating	2026	Winter	F	2	0	1	3
315	Einar Hedegart	Norway	Cross-country skiing	2026	Winter	M	2	0	1	3
352	Thomas Burke	United States	Athletics	1896	Summer	M	2	0	0	2
352	Edwin Flack	Australia	Athletics	1896	Summer	M	2	0	0	2
352	Robert Garrett	United States	Athletics	1896	Summer	M	2	0	0	2
352	Alfréd Hajós	Hungary	Swimming	1896	Summer	M	2	0	0	2
352	Albert Robert Ayat	France	Fencing	1900	Summer	M	2	0	0	2
352	John Arthur Jarvis	Great Britain	Swimming	1900	Summer	M	2	0	0	2
352	Oliver Kirk	United States	Boxing	1904	Summer	M	2	0	0	2
352	Gaston Alibert	France	Fencing	1908	Summer	M	2	0	0	2
352	Ray Ewry	United States	Athletics	1908	Summer	M	2	0	0	2
352	Zoltán Halmay	Hungary	Swimming	1908	Summer	M	2	0	0	2
352	George Larner	Great Britain	Athletics	1908	Summer	M	2	0	0	2
352	Eric Lemming	Sweden	Athletics	1908	Summer	M	2	0	0	2
352	Oscar Swahn	Sweden	Shooting	1908	Summer	M	2	0	0	2
352	Alfred Swahn	Sweden	Shooting	1912	Summer	M	2	0	0	2
352	Armas Taipale	Finland	Athletics	1912	Summer	M	2	0	0	2
352	Jim Thorpe	United States	Athletics	1912	Summer	M	2	0	0	2
352	Albert Hill	Great Britain	Athletics	1920	Summer	M	2	0	0	2
352	Duke Kahanamoku	United States	Swimming	1920	Summer	M	2	0	0	2
352	Charlie Paddock	United States	Athletics	1920	Summer	M	2	0	0	2
352	Morris Fisher	United States	Shooting	1924	Summer	M	2	0	0	2
352	Lucien Gaudin	France	Fencing	1924	Summer	F	2	0	0	2
352	Clarence Houser	United States	Athletics	1924	Summer	M	2	0	0	2
352	Harold Osborn	United States	Athletics	1924	Summer	M	2	0	0	2
352	Adolph van der Voort van Zijp	Netherlands	Equestrian	1924	Summer	M	2	0	0	2
352	Johan Grøttumsbråten	Norway	Cross-country skiing & Nordic combined	1928	Winter	M	2	0	0	2
352	Clas Thunberg	Finland	Speed skating	1928	Winter	M	2	0	0	2
352	George Kojac	United States	Swimming	1928	Summer	M	2	0	0	2
352	Charles Pahud de Mortanges	Netherlands	Equestrian	1928	Summer	M	2	0	0	2
352	Johnny Weissmuller	United States	Swimming	1928	Summer	M	2	0	0	2
352	Irving Jaffee	United States	Speed skating	1932	Winter	M	2	0	0	2
352	Jack Shea	United States	Speed skating	1932	Winter	M	2	0	0	2
352	Ivar Johansson	Sweden	Wrestling	1932	Summer	M	2	0	0	2
352	Yasuji Miyazaki	Japan	Swimming	1932	Summer	M	2	0	0	2
352	Eddie Tolan	United States	Athletics	1932	Summer	M	2	0	0	2
352	Kristjan Palusalu	Estonia	Wrestling	1936	Summer	M	2	0	0	2
352	Martin Lundström	Sweden	Cross-country skiing	1948	Winter	M	2	0	0	2
352	Jehan Buhan	France	Fencing	1948	Summer	M	2	0	0	2
352	Harrison Dillard	United States	Athletics	1948	Summer	M	2	0	0	2
352	Gert Fredriksson	Sweden	Canoeing	1948	Summer	M	2	0	0	2
352	Aladár Gerevich	Hungary	Fencing	1948	Summer	M	2	0	0	2
352	Mel Patton	United States	Athletics	1948	Summer	M	2	0	0	2
352	Wally Ris	United States	Swimming	1948	Summer	M	2	0	0	2
352	Heikki Savolainen	Finland	Gymnastics	1948	Summer	M	2	0	0	2
352	Bill Smith	United States	Swimming	1948	Summer	M	2	0	0	2
352	Andrea Mead Lawrence	United States	Alpine skiing	1952	Winter	F	2	0	0	2
352	Lorenz Nieberl	Germany	Bobsleigh	1952	Winter	M	2	0	0	2
352	Andreas Ostler	Germany	Bobsleigh	1952	Winter	M	2	0	0	2
352	Harrison Dillard	United States	Athletics	1952	Summer	M	2	0	0	2
352	Yrjö Hietanen	Finland	Canoeing	1952	Summer	M	2	0	0	2
352	Christian d'Oriola	France	Fencing	1952	Summer	M	2	0	0	2
352	Pál Kovács	Hungary	Fencing	1952	Summer	M	2	0	0	2
352	André Noyelle	Belgium	Cycling	1952	Summer	M	2	0	0	2
352	Henri Saint Cyr	Sweden	Equestrian	1952	Summer	M	2	0	0	2
352	Kurt Wires	Finland	Canoeing	1952	Summer	M	2	0	0	2
352	Yevgeny Grishin	Soviet Union	Speed skating	1956	Winter	M	2	0	0	2
352	Gert Fredriksson	Sweden	Canoeing	1956	Summer	M	2	0	0	2
352	John Henricks	Australia	Swimming	1956	Summer	M	2	0	0	2
352	Rudolf Kárpáti	Hungary	Fencing	1956	Summer	M	2	0	0	2
352	Henri Saint Cyr	Sweden	Equestrian	1956	Summer	M	2	0	0	2
352	Boris Shakhlin	Soviet Union	Gymnastics	1956	Summer	M	2	0	0	2
352	Hans Günter Winkler	United Team of Germany	Equestrian	1956	Summer	M	2	0	0	2
352	Yevgeny Grishin	Soviet Union	Speed skating	1960	Winter	M	2	0	0	2
352	Lidiya Skoblikova	Soviet Union	Speed skating	1960	Winter	F	2	0	0	2
352	Glenn Davis	United States	Athletics	1960	Summer	M	2	0	0	2
352	Giuseppe Delfino	Italy	Fencing	1960	Summer	M	2	0	0	2
352	Jeff Farrell	United States	Swimming	1960	Summer	M	2	0	0	2
352	Rudolf Kárpáti	Hungary	Fencing	1960	Summer	M	2	0	0	2
352	Mike Troy	United States	Swimming	1960	Summer	M	2	0	0	2
352	Bob Hayes	United States	Athletics	1964	Summer	M	2	0	0	2
352	Gary Ilman	United States	Swimming	1964	Summer	M	2	0	0	2
352	Peter Snell	New Zealand	Athletics	1964	Summer	M	2	0	0	2
352	Haruhiro Yamashita	Japan	Gymnastics	1964	Summer	M	2	0	0	2
352	Luciano de Paolis	Italy	Bobsleigh	1968	Winter	M	2	0	0	2
352	Ole Ellefsæter	Norway	Cross-country skiing	1968	Winter	M	2	0	0	2
352	Harald Grønningen	Norway	Cross-country skiing	1968	Winter	M	2	0	0	2
352	Eugenio Monti	Italy	Bobsleigh	1968	Winter	M	2	0	0	2
352	Mike Burton	United States	Swimming	1968	Summer	M	2	0	0	2
352	Lee Evans	United States	Athletics	1968	Summer	M	2	0	0	2
352	Jim Hines	United States	Athletics	1968	Summer	M	2	0	0	2
352	Don McKenzie	United States	Swimming	1968	Summer	M	2	0	0	2
352	Stephen Rerych	United States	Swimming	1968	Summer	M	2	0	0	2
352	Doug Russell	United States	Swimming	1968	Summer	M	2	0	0	2
352	Wyomia Tyus	United States	Athletics	1968	Summer	F	2	0	0	2
352	Marie-Theres Nadig	Switzerland	Alpine skiing	1972	Winter	F	2	0	0	2
352	Richard Meade	Great Britain	Equestrian	1972	Summer	M	2	0	0	2
352	Wim Ruska	Netherlands	Judo	1972	Summer	M	2	0	0	2
352	Lasse Virén	Finland	Athletics	1972	Summer	M	2	0	0	2
352	Witold Woyda	Poland	Fencing	1972	Summer	M	2	0	0	2
352	Nikolay Kruglov	Soviet Union	Biathlon	1976	Winter	M	2	0	0	2
352	Meinhard Nehmer	East Germany	Bobsleigh	1976	Winter	M	2	0	0	2
352	Bernhard Germeshausen	East Germany	Bobsleigh	1976	Winter	M	2	0	0	2
352	Mike Bruner	United States	Swimming	1976	Summer	M	2	0	0	2
352	Bruce Furniss	United States	Swimming	1976	Summer	M	2	0	0	2
352	Brian Goodell	United States	Swimming	1976	Summer	M	2	0	0	2
352	Alberto Juantorena	Cuba	Athletics	1976	Summer	M	2	0	0	2
352	Lasse Virén	Finland	Athletics	1976	Summer	M	2	0	0	2
352	Matt Vogel	United States	Swimming	1976	Summer	M	2	0	0	2
352	Nellie Kim	Soviet Union	Gymnastics	1980	Summer	F	2	0	0	2
352	Ingemar Stenmark	Sweden	Alpine skiing	1980	Winter	M	2	0	0	2
352	Barbara Petzold	East Germany	Cross-country skiing	1980	Winter	F	2	0	0	2
352	Pascale Trinquet	France	Fencing	1980	Summer	F	2	0	0	2
352	Thomas Wassberg	Sweden	Cross-country skiing	1984	Winter	M	2	0	0	2
352	Wolfgang Hoppe	East Germany	Bobsleigh	1984	Winter	M	2	0	0	2
352	Dietmar Schauerhammer	East Germany	Bobsleigh	1984	Winter	M	2	0	0	2
352	Evelyn Ashford	United States	Athletics	1984	Summer	F	2	0	0	2
352	Alonzo Babers	United States	Athletics	1984	Summer	M	2	0	0	2
352	Alex Baumann	Canada	Swimming	1984	Summer	M	2	0	0	2
352	Bart Conner	United States	Gymnastics	1984	Summer	M	2	0	0	2
352	Tom Jager	United States	Swimming	1984	Summer	M	2	0	0	2
352	Reiner Klimke	West Germany	Equestrian	1984	Summer	M	2	0	0	2
352	Greg Louganis	United States	Diving	1984	Summer	M	2	0	0	2
352	Steve Lundquist	United States	Swimming	1984	Summer	M	2	0	0	2
352	Tomas Gustafson	Sweden	Speed skating	1988	Winter	M	2	0	0	2
352	Gunde Svan	Sweden	Cross-country skiing	1988	Winter	M	2	0	0	2
352	Alberto Tomba	Italy	Alpine skiing	1988	Winter	M	2	0	0	2
352	Tamara Tikhonova	Soviet Union	Cross-country skiing	1988	Winter	F	2	0	0	2
352	Frank-Peter Roetsch	East Germany	Biathlon	1988	Winter	M	2	0	0	2
352	Vreni Schneider	Austria	Alpine skiing	1988	Winter	F	2	0	0	2
352	Troy Dalbey	United States	Swimming	1988	Summer	M	2	0	0	2
352	Tamás Darnyi	Hungary	Swimming	1988	Summer	M	2	0	0	2
352	Jackie Joyner-Kersee	United States	Athletics	1988	Summer	F	2	0	0	2
352	Steve Lewis	United States	Athletics	1988	Summer	M	2	0	0	2
352	Greg Louganis	United States	Diving	1988	Summer	M	2	0	0	2
352	Kim Soo-Nyung	South Korea	Archery	1988	Summer	F	2	0	0	2
352	Bonnie Blair	United States	Speed skating	1992	Winter	F	2	0	0	2
352	Kim Ki-hoon	South Korea	Short track speed skating	1992	Winter	M	2	0	0	2
352	Petra Kronberger	Austria	Alpine skiing	1992	Winter	F	2	0	0	2
352	Nikolay Bukhalov	Bulgaria	Canoeing	1992	Summer	M	2	0	0	2
352	Cho Youn-Jeong	South Korea	Archery	1992	Summer	F	2	0	0	2
352	Tamás Darnyi	Hungary	Swimming	1992	Summer	M	2	0	0	2
352	Nelson Diebel	United States	Swimming	1992	Summer	M	2	0	0	2
352	Carl Lewis	United States	Athletics	1992	Summer	M	2	0	0	2
352	Mike Marsh	United States	Athletics	1992	Summer	M	2	0	0	2
352	Pablo Morales	United States	Swimming	1992	Summer	M	2	0	0	2
352	Deng Yaping	China	Table tennis	1992	Summer	F	2	0	0	2
352	Arkadiusz Skrzypaszek	Poland	Modern pentathlon	1992	Summer	M	2	0	0	2
352	Giovanna Trillini	Italy	Fencing	1992	Summer	F	2	0	0	2
352	Quincy Watts	United States	Athletics	1992	Summer	M	2	0	0	2
352	Myriam Bédard	Canada	Biathlon	1994	Winter	F	2	0	0	2
352	Bonnie Blair	United States	Speed skating	1994	Winter	F	2	0	0	2
352	Chun Lee-Kyung	South Korea	Short track speed skating	1994	Winter	F	2	0	0	2
352	Markus Wasmeier	Germany	Alpine skiing	1994	Winter	M	2	0	0	2
352	Jens Weißflog	Germany	Ski jumping	1994	Winter	M	2	0	0	2
352	Donovan Bailey	Canada	Athletics	1996	Summer	M	2	0	0	2
352	Gail Devers	United States	Athletics	1996	Summer	F	2	0	0	2
352	Martin Doktor	Czech Republic	Canoeing	1996	Summer	M	2	0	0	2
352	Laura Flessel-Colovic	France	Fencing	1996	Summer	F	2	0	0	2
352	Michael Johnson	United States	Athletics	1996	Summer	M	2	0	0	2
352	Kim Kyung-Wook	South Korea	Archery	1996	Summer	F	2	0	0	2
352	Danyon Loader	New Zealand	Swimming	1996	Summer	M	2	0	0	2
352	Shannon Miller	United States	Gymnastics	1996	Summer	F	2	0	0	2
352	Jon Olsen	United States	Swimming	1996	Summer	M	2	0	0	2
352	Liu Guoliang	China	Table tennis	1996	Summer	M	2	0	0	2
352	Deng Yaping	China	Table tennis	1996	Summer	F	2	0	0	2
352	Marie-José Pérec	France	Athletics	1996	Summer	F	2	0	0	2
352	Jeff Rouse	United States	Swimming	1996	Summer	M	2	0	0	2
352	Brad Schumacher	United States	Swimming	1996	Summer	M	2	0	0	2
352	Isabell Werth	Germany	Equestrian	1996	Summer	F	2	0	0	2
352	Thomas Alsgaard	Norway	Cross-country skiing	1998	Winter	M	2	0	0	2
352	Bjarte Engen Vik	Norway	Nordic combined	1998	Winter	M	2	0	0	2
352	Hermann Maier	Austria	Alpine skiing	1998	Winter	M	2	0	0	2
352	Gianni Romme	Netherlands	Speed skating	1998	Winter	M	2	0	0	2
352	Marianne Timmer	Netherlands	Speed skating	1998	Winter	F	2	0	0	2
352	Georgeta Damian	Romania	Rowing	2000	Summer	F	2	0	0	2
352	Maurice Greene	United States	Athletics	2000	Summer	M	2	0	0	2
352	Domenico Fioravanti	Italy	Swimming	2000	Summer	M	2	0	0	2
352	Birgit Fischer	Germany	Canoeing	2000	Summer	F	2	0	0	2
352	Li Xiaopeng	China	Gymnastics	2000	Summer	M	2	0	0	2
352	Robert Korzeniowski	Poland	Athletics	2000	Summer	M	2	0	0	2
352	Yun Mi-Jin	South Korea	Archery	2000	Summer	F	2	0	0	2
352	Amy Van Dyken	United States	Swimming	2000	Summer	F	2	0	0	2
352	Wang Nan	China	Table tennis	2000	Summer	F	2	0	0	2
352	Valentina Vezzali	Italy	Fencing	2000	Summer	F	2	0	0	2
352	Xiong Ni	China	Diving	2000	Summer	M	2	0	0	2
352	Venus Williams	United States	Tennis	2000	Summer	F	2	0	0	2
352	Kjetil André Aamodt	Norway	Alpine skiing	2002	Winter	M	2	0	0	2
352	Thomas Alsgaard	Norway	Cross-country skiing	2002	Winter	M	2	0	0	2
352	Simon Ammann	Switzerland	Ski jumping	2002	Winter	M	2	0	0	2
352	Andrea Henkel	Germany	Biathlon	2002	Winter	F	2	0	0	2
352	Claudia Pechstein	Germany	Speed skating	2002	Winter	F	2	0	0	2
352	Georgeta Damian	Romania	Rowing	2004	Summer	F	2	0	0	2
352	Anastasia Davydova	Russia	Synchronized swimming	2004	Summer	F	2	0	0	2
352	Hicham El Guerrouj	Morocco	Athletics	2004	Summer	M	2	0	0	2
352	Kelly Holmes	Great Britain	Athletics	2004	Summer	F	2	0	0	2
352	Natasa Janics	Hungary	Canoeing	2004	Summer	F	2	0	0	2
352	Guo Jingjing	China	Diving	2004	Summer	F	2	0	0	2
352	Zhang Yining	China	Table tennis	2004	Summer	F	2	0	0	2
352	Nicolás Massú	Chile	Tennis	2004	Summer	M	2	0	0	2
352	Diana Mocanu	Romania	Swimming	2004	Summer	F	2	0	0	2
352	Park Sung-hyun	South Korea	Archery	2004	Summer	F	2	0	0	2
352	Jeremy Wariner	United States	Athletics	2004	Summer	M	2	0	0	2
352	Andre Lange	Germany	Bobsleigh	2006	Winter	M	2	0	0	2
352	Kevin Kuske	Germany	Bobsleigh	2006	Winter	M	2	0	0	2
352	Björn Lind	Sweden	Cross-country skiing	2006	Winter	M	2	0	0	2
352	Benjamin Raich	Austria	Alpine skiing	2006	Winter	M	2	0	0	2
352	Michaela Dorfmeister	Austria	Alpine skiing	2006	Winter	F	2	0	0	2
352	Thomas Morgenstern	Austria	Ski jumping	2006	Winter	M	2	0	0	2
352	Giorgio Di Centa	Italy	Cross-country skiing	2006	Winter	M	2	0	0	2
352	Svetlana Ishmouratova	Russia	Biathlon	2006	Winter	F	2	0	0	2
352	Kristina Šmigun-Vähi	Estonia	Cross-country skiing	2006	Winter	F	2	0	0	2
352	Rebecca Adlington	Great Britain	Swimming	2008	Summer	F	2	0	0	2
352	Usain Bolt	Jamaica	Athletics	2008	Summer	M	2	0	0	2
352	Anastasia Davydova	Russia	Synchronized swimming	2008	Summer	F	2	0	0	2
352	Tirunesh Dibaba	Ethiopia	Athletics	2008	Summer	F	2	0	0	2
352	Guo Jingjing	China	Diving	2008	Summer	F	2	0	0	2
352	Chen Yibing	China	Gymnastics	2008	Summer	M	2	0	0	2
352	Li Xiaopeng	China	Gymnastics	2008	Summer	M	2	0	0	2
352	Xiao Qin	China	Gymnastics	2008	Summer	M	2	0	0	2
352	He Kexin	China	Gymnastics	2008	Summer	F	2	0	0	2
352	Ma Lin	China	Table tennis	2008	Summer	M	2	0	0	2
352	Zhang Yining	China	Table tennis	2008	Summer	F	2	0	0	2
352	Chen Ruolin	China	Diving	2008	Summer	M	2	0	0	2
352	Angelo Taylor	United States	Athletics	2008	Summer	M	2	0	0	2
352	Chen Yibing	China	Gymnastics	2008	Summer	M	2	0	0	2
352	Bradley Wiggins	Great Britain	Cycling	2008	Summer	M	2	0	0	2
352	Simon Ammann	Switzerland	Ski jumping	2010	Winter	M	2	0	0	2
352	Charles Hamelin	Canada	Short track speed skating	2010	Winter	M	2	0	0	2
352	Marcus Hellner	Sweden	Cross-country skiing	2010	Winter	M	2	0	0	2
352	Maria Riesch	Germany	Alpine skiing	2010	Winter	F	2	0	0	2
352	Zhou Yang	China	Short track speed skating	2010	Winter	F	2	0	0	2
352	Chen Ruolin	China	Diving	2012	Summer	F	2	0	0	2
352	Jin Jong-oh	South Korea	Shooting	2012	Summer	M	2	0	0	2
352	Ki Bo-Bae	South Korea	Archery	2012	Summer	F	2	0	0	2
352	Elisa Di Francisca	Italy	Fencing	2012	Summer	F	2	0	0	2
352	Gabby Douglas	United States	Gymnastics	2012	Summer	F	2	0	0	2
352	Charlotte Dujardin	Great Britain	Equestrian	2012	Summer	F	2	0	0	2
352	Mo Farah	Great Britain	Athletics	2012	Summer	M	2	0	0	2
352	Chris Hoy	Great Britain	Cycling	2012	Summer	M	2	0	0	2
352	Natalia Ishchenko	Russia	Synchronized swimming	2012	Summer	F	2	0	0	2
352	Jin Jong-oh	South Korea	Shooting	2012	Summer	M	2	0	0	2
352	Jason Kenny	Great Britain	Cycling	2012	Summer	M	2	0	0	2
352	Danuta Kozák	Hungary	Canoeing	2012	Summer	F	2	0	0	2
352	Li Xiaoxia	China	Table Tennis	2012	Summer	F	2	0	0	2
352	Svetlana Romashina	Russia	Synchronized swimming	2012	Summer	F	2	0	0	2
352	Laura Trott	Great Britain	Cycling	2012	Summer	F	2	0	0	2
352	Serena Williams	United States	Tennis	2012	Summer	F	2	0	0	2
352	Wu Minxia	China	Diving	2012	Summer	F	2	0	0	2
352	Ye Shiwen	China	Swimming	2012	Summer	F	2	0	0	2
352	Zhang Jike	China	Table Tennis	2012	Summer	M	2	0	0	2
352	Zhao Yunlei	China	Badminton	2012	Summer	F	2	0	0	2
352	Feng Zhe	China	Gymnastics	2012	Summer	M	2	0	0	2
352	Ole Einar Bjørndalen	Norway	Biathlon	2014	Winter	M	2	0	0	2
352	Emil Hegle Svendsen	Norway	Biathlon	2014	Winter	M	2	0	0	2
352	Jørgen Gråbak	Norway	Nordic combined	2014	Winter	M	2	0	0	2
352	Natalie Geisenberger	Germany	Luge	2014	Winter	F	2	0	0	2
352	Felix Loch	Germany	Luge	2014	Winter	M	2	0	0	2
352	Tobias Wendl	Germany	Luge	2014	Winter	M	2	0	0	2
352	Tobias Arlt	Germany	Luge	2014	Winter	M	2	0	0	2
352	Tatiana Volosozhar	Russia	Figure skating	2014	Winter	F	2	0	0	2
352	Vic Wild	Russia	Snowboarding	2014	Winter	M	2	0	0	2
352	Park Seung-hi	South Korea	Short track speed skating	2014	Winter	F	2	0	0	2
352	Dario Cologna	Switzerland	Cross-country skiing	2014	Winter	M	2	0	0	2
352	Tina Maze	Slovenia	Alpine skiing	2014	Winter	F	2	0	0	2
352	Kamil Stoch	Poland	Ski jumping	2014	Winter	M	2	0	0	2
352	Jorien ter Mors	Netherlands	Speed skating	2014	Winter	F	2	0	0	2
352	Chang Hye-jin	South Korea	Archery	2016	Summer	F	2	0	0	2
352	Anthony Ervin	United States	Swimming	2016	Summer	M	2	0	0	2
352	Lilly King	United States	Swimming	2016	Summer	F	2	0	0	2
352	Mo Farah	Great Britain	Athletics	2016	Summer	M	2	0	0	2
352	Natalia Ishchenko	Russia	Synchronized swimming	2016	Summer	F	2	0	0	2
352	Ku Bon-chan	South Korea	Archery	2016	Summer	M	2	0	0	2
352	Svetlana Romashina	Russia	Synchronized swimming	2016	Summer	F	2	0	0	2
352	Kohei Uchimura	Japan	Gymnastics	2016	Summer	M	2	0	0	2
352	Laura Trott	Great Britain	Cycling	2016	Summer	F	2	0	0	2
352	Shi Tingmao	China	Diving	2016	Summer	F	2	0	0	2
352	Chen Aishen	China	Diving	2016	Summer	M	2	0	0	2
352	Ding Ning	China	Table Tennis	2016	Summer	F	2	0	0	2
352	Ma Long	China	Table Tennis	2016	Summer	M	2	0	0	2
352	Gabriella Szabó	Hungary	Canoeing	2016	Summer	F	2	0	0	2
352	Sebastian Brendel	Germany	Canoeing	2016	Summer	M	2	0	0	2
352	Max Rendschmidt	Germany	Canoeing	2016	Summer	M	2	0	0	2
352	Marcus Gross	Germany	Canoeing	2016	Summer	M	2	0	0	2
352	Yana Egorian	Russia	Fencing	2016	Summer	F	2	0	0	2
352	Ester Ledecká	Czech Republic	Alpine skiing, Snowboarding	2018	Winter	F	2	0	0	2
352	Nana Takagi	Japan	Speed skating	2018	Winter	F	2	0	0	2
352	Kjeld Nuis	Netherlands	Speed skating	2018	Winter	M	2	0	0	2
352	Natalie Geisenberger	Germany	Luge	2018	Winter	F	2	0	0	2
352	Tobias Wendl	Germany	Luge	2018	Winter	M	2	0	0	2
352	Tobias Arlt	Germany	Luge	2018	Winter	M	2	0	0	2
352	Johannes Rydzek	Germany	Nordic combined	2018	Winter	M	2	0	0	2
352	Francesco Friedrich	Germany	Bobsleigh	2018	Winter	M	2	0	0	2
352	Thorsten Margis	Germany	Bobsleigh	2018	Winter	M	2	0	0	2
352	Tessa Virtue	Canada	Figure skating	2018	Winter	F	2	0	0	2
352	Scott Moir	Canada	Figure skating	2018	Winter	M	2	0	0	2
352	Choi Min-jeong	South Korea	Short track speed skating	2018	Winter	F	2	0	0	2
352	Marcel Hirscher	Austria	Alpine skiing	2018	Winter	M	2	0	0	2
352	Ragnhild Haga	Norway	Cross-country skiing	2018	Winter	F	2	0	0	2
352	Yang Qian	China	Shooting	2020	Summer	F	2	0	0	2
352	Kim Je-deok	South Korea	Archery	2020	Summer	M	2	0	0	2
352	Jessica von Bredow-Werndl	Germany	Equestrian	2020	Summer	F	2	0	0	2
352	Sofia Pozdniakova	ROC	Fencing	2020	Summer	F	2	0	0	2
352	Yui Ohashi	Japan	Swimming	2020	Summer	F	2	0	0	2
352	Tom Dean	Great Britain	Swimming	2020	Summer	M	2	0	0	2
352	Bobby Finke	United States	Swimming	2020	Summer	M	2	0	0	2
352	Zach Apple	United States	Swimming	2020	Summer	M	2	0	0	2
352	Blake Pieroni	United States	Swimming	2020	Summer	M	2	0	0	2
352	Shi Tingmao	China	Diving	2020	Summer	F	2	0	0	2
352	Xie Shiyi	China	Diving	2020	Summer	M	2	0	0	2
352	Svetlana Romashina	ROC	Synchronized swimming	2020	Summer	F	2	0	0	2
352	Svetlana Kolesnichenko	ROC	Synchronized swimming	2020	Summer	F	2	0	0	2
352	Chen Meng	China	Table Tennis	2020	Summer	F	2	0	0	2
352	Ma Long	China	Table Tennis	2020	Summer	M	2	0	0	2
352	Clarisse Agbegnenou	France	Judo	2020	Summer	F	2	0	0	2
352	Marcell Jacobs	Italy	Athletics	2020	Summer	M	2	0	0	2
352	Athing Mu	United States	Athletics	2020	Summer	F	2	0	0	2
352	Sydney McLaughlin-Levrone	United States	Athletics	2020	Summer	F	2	0	0	2
352	Ren Ziwei	China	Short track speed skating	2022	Winter	M	2	0	0	2
352	Urša Bogataj	Slovenia	Ski jumping	2022	Winter	F	2	0	0	2
352	Natalie Geisenberger	Germany	Luge	2022	Winter	F	2	0	0	2
352	Johannes Ludwig	Germany	Luge	2022	Winter	M	2	0	0	2
352	Tobias Wendl	Germany	Luge	2022	Winter	M	2	0	0	2
352	Tobias Arlt	Germany	Luge	2022	Winter	M	2	0	0	2
352	Nils van der Poel	Sweden	Speed skating	2022	Winter	M	2	0	0	2
352	Lindsey Jacobellis	United States	Snowboarding	2022	Winter	F	2	0	0	2
352	Nathan Chen	United States	Figure skating	2022	Winter	M	2	0	0	2
352	Francesco Friedrich	Germany	Bobsleigh	2022	Winter	M	2	0	0	2
352	Thorsten Margis	Germany	Bobsleigh	2022	Winter	M	2	0	0	2
352	Sydney McLaughlin-Levrone	United States	Athletics	2024	Summer	F	2	0	0	2
352	Shayna Jack	Australia	Swimming	2024	Summer	F	2	0	0	2
352	Kristen Faulkner	United States	Cycling	2024	Summer	F	2	0	0	2
352	Jennifer Valente	United States	Cycling	2024	Summer	F	2	0	0	2
352	Alicia Hoskin	New Zealand	Canoeing	2024	Summer	F	2	0	0	2
352	Sarah Sjöström	Sweden	Swimming	2024	Summer	F	2	0	0	2
352	Oh Sang-uk	South Korea	Fencing	2024	Summer	M	2	0	0	2
352	Jessica von Bredow-Werndl	Germany	Equestrian	2024	Summer	F	2	0	0	2
352	Chen Meng	China	Table Tennis	2024	Summer	F	2	0	0	2
352	Teddy Riner	France	Judo	2024	Summer	M	2	0	0	2
352	Jessica Fox	Australia	Canoeing	2024	Summer	F	2	0	0	2
352	Lee Kiefer	United States	Fencing	2024	Summer	F	2	0	0	2
352	Rai Benjamin	United States	Athletics	2024	Summer	M	2	0	0	2
352	Remco Evenepoel	Belgium	Cycling	2024	Summer	M	2	0	0	2
352	Jacob Schopf	Germany	Canoeing	2024	Summer	M	2	0	0	2
352	Wang Liuyi	China	Synchronized swimming	2024	Summer	F	2	0	0	2
352	Beatrice Chebet	Kenya	Athletics	2024	Summer	F	2	0	0	2
352	Fan Zhendong	China	Table Tennis	2024	Summer	M	2	0	0	2
352	Carlos Yulo	Philippines	Gymnastics	2024	Summer	M	2	0	0	2
352	Sheng Lihao	China	Shooting	2024	Summer	M	2	0	0	2
352	Wang Chuqin	China	Table Tennis	2024	Summer	M	2	0	0	2
352	Chen Yiwen	China	Diving	2024	Summer	M	2	0	0	2
352	Max Lemke	Germany	Canoeing	2024	Summer	M	2	0	0	2
352	Quan Hongchan	China	Diving	2024	Summer	F	2	0	0	2
352	Wang Qianyi	China	Synchronized swimming	2024	Summer	F	2	0	0	2
352	Matt Weston	Great Britain	Skeleton	2026	Winter	M	2	0	0	2
352	Max Langenhan	Germany	Luge	2026	Winter	M	2	0	0	2
352	Julia Taubitz	Germany	Luge	2026	Winter	F	2	0	0	2
352	Federica Brignone	Italy	Alpine skiing	2026	Winter	F	2	0	0	2
352	Francesca Lollobrigida	Italy	Speed skating	2026	Winter	F	2	0	0	2
352	Xandra Velzeboer	Netherlands	Short track speed skating	2026	Winter	F	2	0	0	2
352	Domen Prevc	Slovenia	Ski jumping	2026	Winter	M	2	0	0	2
352	Alysa Liu	United States	Figure skating	2026	Winter	F	2	0	0	2

=== Timeline ===
The historical progression of the leading performance(s).

Gold medals	Year	Record duration	Athlete	Nation	Sport(s)	Games	Sex
4	1896	1896–1904	Carl Schuhmann	Germany	Gymnastics, Wrestling	Summer	M
4	1900	1900–1904	Alvin Kraenzlein	United States	Athletics	Summer	M
5	1904	1904–1972	Anton Heida	United States	Gymnastics	Summer	M
5	1920	1920–1972	Nedo Nadi	Italy	Fencing	Summer	M
5	1920	1920–1972	Willis A. Lee	United States	Shooting	Summer	M
5	1924	1924–1972	Paavo Nurmi	Finland	Athletics	Summer	M
7	1972	1972–2008	Mark Spitz	United States	Swimming	Summer	M
8	2008	2008–present	Michael Phelps	United States	Swimming	Summer	M

== List of most individual gold medals won at a single Olympic Games ==
Rank	Athlete	Nation	Sport	Year	Games	Sex	Gold medal	Silver medal	Bronze medal	
1	Eric Heiden	United States	Speed skating	1980	Winter	M	5	0	0	5
1	Vitaly Scherbo	Unified Team	Gymnastics	1992	Summer	M	5	0	0	5
1	Michael Phelps	United States	Swimming	2008	Summer	M	5	0	0	5
4	Boris Shakhlin	Soviet Union	Gymnastics	1960	Summer	M	4	1	1	6
4	Nikolai Andrianov	Soviet Union	Gymnastics	1976	Summer	M	4	1	1	6
6	Anton Heida	United States	Gymnastics	1904	Summer	M	4	1	0	5
6	Věra Čáslavská	Czechoslovakia	Gymnastics	1968	Summer	F	4	1	0	5
8	Marcus Hurley	United States	Cycling	1904	Summer	M	4	0	1	5
8	Michael Phelps	United States	Swimming	2004	Summer	M	4	0	1	5
10	Alvin Kraenzlein	United States	Athletics	1900	Summer	M	4	0	0	4
10	Lidia Skoblikova	Soviet Union	Speed skating	1964	Winter	F	4	0	0	4
10	Mark Spitz	United States	Swimming	1972	Summer	M	4	0	0	4
10	Kristin Otto	East Germany	Swimming	1988	Summer	F	4	0	0	4
10	Léon Marchand	France	Swimming	2024	Summer	M	4	0	0	4
10	Johannes Høsflot Klæbo	Norway	Cross-country skiing	2026	Winter	M	4	0	0	4
16	George Eyser	United States	Gymnastics	1904	Summer	M	3	2	1	6
17	Viktor Chukarin	Soviet Union	Gymnastics	1952	Summer	M	3	2	0	5
18	Clas Thunberg	Finland	Speed skating	1924	Winter	M	3	1	1	5
18	Larisa Latynina	Soviet Union	Gymnastics	1956	Summer	F	3	1	1	5
18	Akinori Nakayama	Japan	Gymnastics	1968	Summer	M	3	1	1	5
18	Shane Gould	Australia	Swimming	1972	Summer	F	3	1	1	5
18	Li Ning	China	Gymnastics	1984	Summer	M	3	1	1	5
18	Daniela Silivas	Romania	Gymnastics	1988	Summer	F	3	1	1	5
24	Ivar Ballangrud	Norway	Speed skating	1936	Winter	M	3	1	0	4
24	Ágnes Keleti	Hungary	Gymnastics	1956	Summer	F	3	1	0	4
24	Ecaterina Szabo	Romania	Gymnastics	1984	Summer	F	3	1	0	4
24	Vladimir Artemov	Soviet Union	Gymnastics	1988	Summer	M	3	1	0	4
24	Leontien van Moorsel	Netherlands	Cycling	2000	Summer	F	3	1	0	4
24	Janica Kostelić	Croatia	Alpine skiing	2002	Winter	F	3	1	0	4
24	Katinka Hosszú	Hungary	Swimming	2016	Summer	F	3	1	0	4
24	Summer McIntosh	Canada	Swimming	2024	Summer	F	3	1	0	4
32	Nadia Comaneci	Romania	Gymnastics	1976	Summer	F	3	0	1	4
32	Michelle Smith	Ireland	Swimming	1996	Summer	F	3	0	1	4
32	Simone Biles	United States	Gymnastics	2016	Summer	F	3	0	1	4
35	Ray Ewry	United States	Athletics	1900	Summer	M	3	0	0	3
35	Ray Ewry	United States	Athletics	1904	Summer	M	3	0	0	3
35	Archie Hahn	United States	Athletics	1904	Summer	M	3	0	0	3
35	Nedo Nadi	Italy	Fencing	1920	Summer	M	3	0	0	3
35	Thorleif Haug	Norway	Cross-country skiing& Nordic combined	1924	Winter	M	3	0	0	3
35	Paavo Nurmi	Finland	Athletics	1924	Summer	M	3	0	0	3
35	Jesse Owens	United States	Athletics	1936	Summer	M	3	0	0	3
35	Fanny Blankers-Koen	Netherlands	Athletics	1948	Summer	F	3	0	0	3
35	Hjalmar Andersen	Norway	Speed skating	1952	Winter	M	3	0	0	3
35	Emil Zátopek	Czechoslovakia	Athletics	1952	Summer	M	3	0	0	3
35	Toni Sailer	Austria	Alpine skiing	1956	Winter	M	3	0	0	3
35	Věra Čáslavská	Czechoslovakia	Gymnastics	1964	Summer	F	3	0	0	3
35	Debbie Meyer	United States	Swimming	1968	Summer	F	3	0	0	3
35	Jean-Claude Killy	France	Alpine skiing	1968	Winter	M	3	0	0	3
35	Ard Schenk	Netherlands	Speed skating	1972	Winter	M	3	0	0	3
35	Kornelia Ender	East Germany	Swimming	1976	Summer	F	3	0	0	3
35	Marja-Liisa Hämäläinen	Finland	Cross-country skiing	1984	Winter	F	3	0	0	3
35	Carl Lewis	United States	Athletics	1984	Summer	M	3	0	0	3
35	Janet Evans	United States	Swimming	1988	Summer	F	3	0	0	3
35	Yvonne van Gennip	Netherlands	Speed skating	1988	Winter	F	3	0	0	3
35	Krisztina Egerszegi	Hungary	Swimming	1992	Summer	F	3	0	0	3
35	Johann Olav Koss	Norway	Speed skating	1994	Winter	M	3	0	0	3
35	Inge de Bruijn	Netherlands	Swimming	2000	Summer	F	3	0	0	3
35	Ole Einar Bjørndalen	Norway	Biathlon	2002	Winter	M	3	0	0	3
35	Darya Domracheva	Belarus	Biathlon	2014	Winter	F	3	0	0	3
35	Katie Ledecky	United States	Swimming	2016	Summer	F	3	0	0	3
35	Caeleb Dressel	United States	Swimming	2020	Summer	M	3	0	0	3
35	Irene Schouten	Netherlands	Speed skating	2022	Winter	F	3	0	0	3
35	Therese Johaug	Norway	Cross-country skiing	2022	Winter	F	3	0	0	3

=== Timeline ===
The historical progression of the leading performance(s).

Gold medals	Year	Record duration	Athlete	Nation	Sport(s)	Games	Sex
4	1900	1900–1980	Alvin Kraenzlein	United States	Athletics	Summer	M
4	1904	1904–1980	Anton Heida	United States	Gymnastics	Summer	M
4	1904	1904–1980	Marcus Hurley	United States	Cycling	Summer	M
4	1960	1960–1980	Boris Shakhlin	Soviet Union	Gymnastics	Summer	M
4	1964	1964–1980	Lidia Skoblikova	Soviet Union	Speed skating	Winter	F
4	1968	1968–1980	Věra Čáslavská	Czechoslovakia	Gymnastics	Summer	F
4	1972	1972–1980	Mark Spitz	United States	Swimming	Summer	M
4	1976	1976–1980	Nikolai Andrianov	Soviet Union	Gymnastics	Summer	M
5	1980	1980–present	Eric Heiden	United States	Speed skating	Winter	M
5	1992	1992–present	Vitaly Scherbo	Unified Team	Gymnastics	Summer	M
5	2008	2008–present	Michael Phelps	United States	Swimming	Summer	M

== See also ==
- List of multiple Olympic gold medalists
- List of multiple Olympic gold medalists in one event
- List of Olympic sweeps in Athletics
- List of multiple Paralympic gold medalists
- All-time Olympic Games medal table
- List of multiple Paralympic gold medalists at a single Games
