= Herman Glass =

American gymnast (1880–1961)

- Born: October 15, 1880
- Died: January 13, 1961 (aged 80)

Gymnastics career
- Discipline: Men's artistic gymnastics
- Country represented: United States
Medal record
Men's artistic gymnastics
Representing the United States
Olympic Games
Gold medal – first place	1904 St Louis	Rings

Herman Theobald Glass (October 15, 1880 – January 13, 1961) was an American gymnast who competed in the 1904 Summer Olympics.

In 1904, he won the gold medal in the rings event.
