= John Duha =

American gymnast

- Full name: John Alexander Duha
- Born: 16 February 1875 Chicago, Illinois, U.S.
- Died: 21 January 1940 (aged 64) Chicago, Illinois, U.S.

Gymnastics career
- Discipline: Men's artistic gymnastics
- Country represented: United States
- Gym: Chicago Central Turnverein
Medal record
Men's artistic gymnastics
Representing United States
Event	1st	2nd	3rd
Olympic Games	0	0	2
Total	0	0	2
Olympic Games
Bronze medal – third place	1904 St. Louis	Team
Bronze medal – third place	1904 St. Louis	Parallel bars

John Alexander Duha (February 16, 1875 in Chicago, Illinois – January 21, 1940 in Chicago, Illinois) was an American gymnast and track and field athlete who competed in the 1904 Summer Olympics. In 1904 he won the bronze medals in the parallel bars event and team competition.

In the 1904 Summer Olympics he participated in the following events:

- Gymnastics combined - fourth place
- Gymnastics triathlon - 22nd place
- Gymnastics all-around - 24th place
- Athletics triathlon - 36th place
- Horizontal bar - result unknown
- Vault - result unknown
- Pommel horse - result unknown
