= George Eyser =

American gymnast

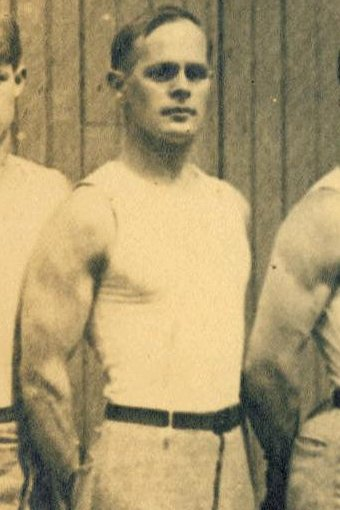

Personal information
- Full name: Georg Ludwig Friedrich Julius Eÿser
- Born: August 31, 1870 Dänisch-Nienhof near Kiel, Germany
- Died: March 6, 1919 (aged 48) Denver, Colorado, United States
- Height: 170 cm (5 ft 7 in)

Gymnastics career
- Discipline: Men's artistic gymnastics
- Club: Concordia
Medal record
Men's gymnastics
Representing the United States
Olympic Games
Gold medal – first place	1904 St. Louis	Rope climbing
Gold medal – first place	1904 St. Louis	Vault
Gold medal – first place	1904 St. Louis	Parallel bars
Silver medal – second place	1904 St. Louis	Combined 4 events
Silver medal – second place	1904 St. Louis	Pommel horse
Bronze medal – third place	1904 St. Louis	Horizontal bar

George Louis Eyser (August 31, 1870 – March 6, 1919) was a German-American gymnast who competed in the 1904 Summer Olympics, earning six medals in one day, including three gold and two silver medals. Eyser competed with a wooden prosthesis for a left leg, having lost his leg after being run over by a train. Despite his disability, he won gold in the vault, an event which then included a jump over a long horse without aid of a springboard.

== Biography ==
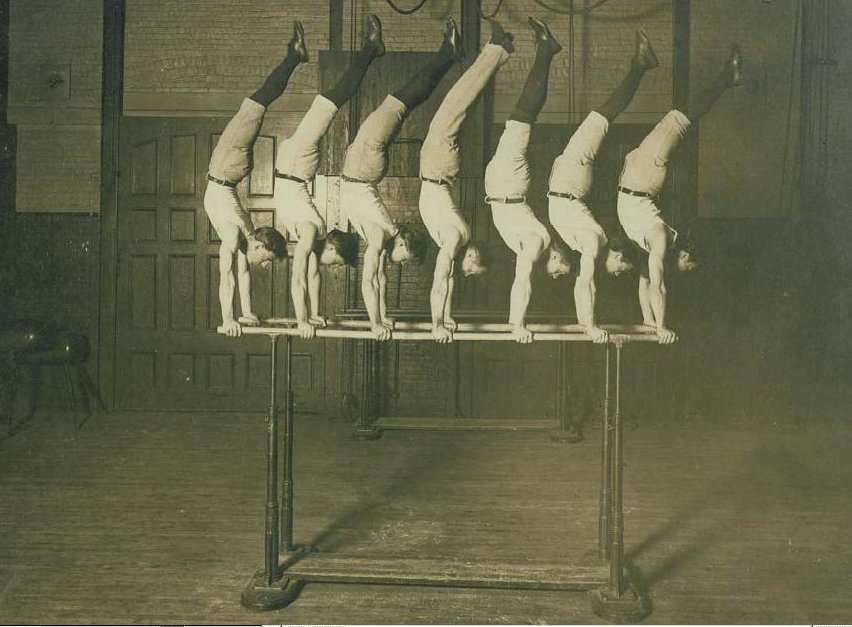
Concordia team in 1908, Eyser is in the center.

Eyser was born on August 31, 1870, in Kiel, Germany, as the only child of Georg Sophus Jasper Eÿser and Auguste Friederike Henriette Eÿser (née Marxen). When he was 14, his family emigrated to the United States (Eyser obtained US citizenship in 1894). The family first lived in Denver, Colorado, but George moved to St. Louis, Missouri, sometime around 1902–1903, where he worked as a bookkeeper for a construction company. There, he joined a local gymnastics club Concordia Turnverein Saint Louis. At some point in his youth, he lost most of his left leg, which had to be amputated after a train ran over it. It was replaced by a wooden prosthesis, which allowed physical activities such as running and jumping. A keen sportsman, Eyser pursued training, aiming for the 1904 Olympics.

== Olympic career ==
The 1904 Olympics, held in St. Louis, were the third Olympics held and the first where gold, silver, and bronze medals were introduced for the first three places. Cups or trophies were given to the winners at the previous games. The 1904 games generally had a confusing program of events, which were spread out over several months, and the gymnastics competition was no different. There were two sets of gymnastic events: International Turners' Championship, which was held on July 1–2 and comprised the all-around, triathlon, and team events, and Olympic Gymnastics Championships, held on October 29, which comprised seven individual apparatus events and the combined event. The individual all-around was a combination of the gymnastic triathlon competition and the athletics triathlon. The team competition was a combination of individual scores from the individual all-around. The parallel bars, horizontal bar, vault, and pommel horse scores for each gymnast were summed to get the "combined" score.

Eyser competed in both sets and did poorly in the first one. He was placed 10th in the gymnastic 9-event all-around competition, which included 3 routines on both the horizontal bar and parallel bars, two on the pommel horse, and one on the vault. Eyser was 71st in another gymnastic all-around event, which included the same devices but a smaller number of routines. He also competed in the athletics triathlon but finished the last with the results of 8 m (26.1 ft) in shot put, 15.4 s in 100 meters sprint, and 4 m (13 ft) in the long jump.

Eyser performed much better in the second competition set. On a single day, October 29, he won 6 medals in total, of which 3 were gold (parallel bars, long horse vault, and 25-foot rope climbing), two silver (pommel horse and 4-event all-around), and one bronze (horizontal bar). His main rival was another American, Anton Heida, who also won 6 medals, 5 gold and one silver. Heida shared gold with Eyser in the vault, was second after Eyser on parallel bars, but won the horizontal bar, pommel horse, all-around, and team competitions. In the team competition, which was then held by the clubs, Concordia finished fourth.

Before 2008, Eyser was the only person with an artificial leg to have competed at the Olympic Games. Later, in 2008 Natalie du Toit, a South African swimmer who lost her left leg in a traffic accident, participated in the 10 km swimming marathon at the 2008 Summer Olympics in Beijing and finished 16th, and in 2012 Oscar Pistorius, a South African double-leg amputee runner, participated in the 2012 Summer Olympics in London in the 400-metre race and the 4x400 relay.

=== Later life ===
After his Olympic success, Eyser continued competing for Concordia, with the club winning the 1908 international meet in Frankfurt, Germany, and the 1909 national meet in Cincinnati, Ohio. He died by suicide on March 6, 1919, in Denver.

== See also ==
- List of multiple Olympic medalists at a single Games
- Olivér Halassy
