= Viktor Chukarin =

Soviet gymnast (1921–1984)

Personal information
- Full name: Viktor Ivanovich Chukarin
- Born: 9 November 1921 Krasnoarmeyskoye, Donets Governorate, Ukrainian SSR
- Died: 25 August 1984 (aged 62) Lviv, Ukrainian SSR, Soviet Union

Gymnastics career
- Discipline: Men's artistic gymnastics
- Country represented: Soviet Union
- Club: Iskra Lvov; Burevestnik Lvov
- Head coaches: Adzhatulla Ibadulayev; Petro Sobenko
- Former coach: Vitaliy Popovich (first coach)
- Retired: late 1950s
Medal record
Olympic Games
Gold medal – first place	1952 Helsinki	Team competition
Gold medal – first place	1952 Helsinki	All-around
Gold medal – first place	1952 Helsinki	Pommel horse
Gold medal – first place	1952 Helsinki	Vault
Gold medal – first place	1956 Melbourne	Team competition
Gold medal – first place	1956 Melbourne	All-around
Gold medal – first place	1956 Melbourne	Parallel bars
Silver medal – second place	1952 Helsinki	Rings
Silver medal – second place	1952 Helsinki	Parallel bars
Silver medal – second place	1956 Melbourne	Floor exercise
Bronze medal – third place	1956 Melbourne	Pommel horse
World Championships
Gold medal – first place	1954 Rome	Team
Gold medal – first place	1954 Rome	All-around
Gold medal – first place	1954 Rome	Parallel bars
Bronze medal – third place	1954 Rome	Pommel horse

Viktor Ivanovich Chukarin (Russian: Виктор Иванович Чукарин, Ukrainian: Віктор Іванович Чукарін; 9 November 1921 – 25 August 1984) was a Ukrainian gymnast who competed for the Soviet Union. He won eleven medals, including seven gold medals at the 1952 and 1956 Summer Olympics (including the individual all-around title on both occasions) and was the all-around world champion in 1954. He was the most successful athlete at the 1952 Summer Olympics. His performance at the 1952 Summer Olympics became second after Anton Heida for medals received in gymnastics, which was overcome by Boris Shakhlin at the 1960 Summer Olympics.

== Biography ==
Chukarin was born in Krasnoarmeyskoye village in Donets Governorate (Note: Donetsk Oblast was not created until later (1938).) (modern-day Novoazovsk Raion of the Donetsk Oblast) to a Don Cossack father Ivan Evlampievich Chukarin and a Pontic Greek mother Hristina Klimentievna Lamizova. In 1924 his family moved to Mariupol where he started training in gymnastics. He began gymnastics classes in the yard on the horizontal bar, then in the school section under the leadership of Vitaliy Polikarpovich Popovich. During the Stalinist years of the "Great Terror", the Chukarin family experienced a tragedy: in 1937, Chukarin's father was repressed for a letter to his relatives who lived in Romania in which he asked for help with food.

Later, Chukarin studied at the Institute of Physical Education in Kyiv. In 1940, Chukarin became a champion of Ukraine during the Ukrainian championship in Kharkiv and received the title of the Master of Sports.

In the summer of 1941, with the start of the German–Soviet War, he volunteered for the Red Army. He fought under the general Mikhail Kirponos. Sometime in September of 1941, Chukarin was wounded in action, taken prisoner of war near Poltava (Kyiv Cauldron) and sent to a prisoner camp in Sandbostel. He then went through a chain of 17 prisoner camps and by the time he was freed in 1945 weighed only 40 kg (88 lb). He was not accepted back to the sports institute in Kyiv and studied in a similar institution in Lviv.

In 1946, he already competed in gymnastics at the Soviet national championships; next year, he finished fifth, and in 1948 won a national title. He became the all-around Soviet champion in 1949 and repeated this achievement in 1950, 1951, 1953, and 1955. In 1951, for his sports performances, Chukarin was granted an honorary sports title as the Honoured Master of Sports.

In 1952, when the Soviet Union joined the International Olympic Movement, Chukarin was 30. By then, Chukarin gained much weight and was considered bulky for a gymnast. As a result, he had low scores on the floor, yet he won six medals, including the individual all-around by a margin of 0.7 points. Nevertheless, with four gold and two silver medals, he became a star feature of the Soviet Olympic team and the leader among the Olympic medalists. Aged 35, he won five more Olympic medals at the 1956 Summer Olympics, including a silver on the floor.

He led the Soviet team to victory at the 1954 World Championships, winning gold in the team all-around and the individual all-around.

In 1957 along with Larisa Latynina, Chukarin was awarded the first ever Order of Lenin given to an athlete.

He recounted his sports career in the 1955 book entitled The Road to the Peaks (Put K Vershinam). In 1961, he coached Armenian gymnastics team, and in 1963 became an assistant professor at the Lviv Institute of Physical Culture. He died in 1984 and was buried at the Lychakiv Cemetery. One of the streets in Lviv was named after him.

== See also ==
- List of multiple Olympic gold medalists
- List of multiple Olympic gold medalists at a single Games
- List of multiple Summer Olympic medalists
- List of Olympic medal leaders in men's gymnastics
