= Edward Hennig =

American artistic gymnast

- Born: October 13, 1879
- Died: August 28, 1960 (aged 80) Summit County, Ohio, U.S.

Gymnastics career
- Discipline: Men's artistic gymnastics
- Country represented: United States
Medal record
Men's gymnastics
Representing the United States
Olympic Games
Gold medal – first place	1904 St. Louis	Horizontal bar
Gold medal – first place	1904 St. Louis	Club swinging

Edward August Hennig (October 13, 1879 – August 28, 1960) was an American gymnast who competed in the 1904 Summer Olympics. He died in Summit County, Ohio.

Hennig won two gold medals, one of them at club swinging. In the horizontal bar event he and his countryman Anton Heida had the same score and the gold medal was shared between them.

He also competed in the pommel horse event without winning a medal. In the all-around event he finished 50th, in the team competition he was a member of the Turnverein Vorwärts (Cleveland) which finished 13th. In the gymnastics triathlon he finished 59th and in the athletics triathlon he finished 36th.
