= Gymnastics at the 1904 Summer Olympics – Men's pommel horse =

Men's pommel horse at the Games of the III Olympiad
- Artistic gymnastics pictogram
- Venue: Francis Olympic Field
- Date: October 28, 1904
- Competitors: ? from ? nations
- Winning score: 42

Medalists
1st place, gold medalist(s)		Anton Heida; United States
2nd place, silver medalist(s)		George Eyser; United States
3rd place, bronze medalist(s)		William Merz; United States

The men's pommel horse was an artistic gymnastics event held as part of the gymnastics programme at the 1904 Summer Olympics. It was the second time the event was held at the Olympics. An unknown number of gymnasts competed, only five are known. The competition was held on Friday, October 28, 1904. All known competitors were American. The event was won by Anton Heida, with George Eyser second and William Merz third.

== Background ==
This was the second appearance of the event, which is one of the five apparatus events held every time there were apparatus events at the Summer Olympics (no apparatus events were held in 1900, 1908, 1912, or 1920).

== Competition format ==
Each gymnast performed three exercises on the horse, all voluntary in design. Three judges each gave scores from 0 to 5 for each exercise; thus, the maximum for an exercise was 15 and the maximum total was 45.

== Schedule ==
Date	Time	Round
Friday, 28 October 1904		Final

== Results ==
Rank	Gymnast	Nation	Score
1st place, gold medalist(s)	Anton Heida	United States	42
2nd place, silver medalist(s)	George Eyser	United States	33
3rd place, bronze medalist(s)	William Merz	United States	29
4–5	John Duha	United States	
4–5	Edward Hennig	United States	

== Sources ==
- De Wael, Herman (2000). "Herman's Full Olympians".
- Wudarski, Pawel (1999). "Wyniki Igrzysk Olimpijskich" (in Polish).
