= William Merz =

American sportsman (1878–1946)

Olympic medal record

Men's gymnastics

Representing the United States
Silver medal – second place	1904 St Louis	Rings
Bronze medal – third place	1904 St Louis	Combined
Bronze medal – third place	1904 St Louis	Vault
Bronze medal – third place	1904 St Louis	Pommel horse

Men's athletics
Bronze medal – third place	1904 St Louis	Triathlon

William G. Merz (April 25, 1878 – March 17, 1946) was an American gymnast and track and field athlete who competed in the 1904 Summer Olympics. He died in Overland, Missouri.

In 1904 he won the silver medal in the rings event and a bronze medal in combined event, in vault event, in pommel horse event and in athletics' triathlon. He was fourth in team event, tenth in all-around competition and 24th in gymnastics' triathlon event.
