= Anton Heida =

American artistic gymnast

- Born: December 24, 1878 Prague, Austria-Hungary
- Died: unknown

Gymnastics career
- Discipline: Men's artistic gymnastics
- Country represented: United States
Medal record
Men's artistic gymnastics
Representing the United States
Olympic Games
Gold medal – first place	1904 St. Louis	Team competition
Gold medal – first place	1904 St. Louis	Combined
Gold medal – first place	1904 St. Louis	Pommel horse
Gold medal – first place	1904 St. Louis	Vault
Gold medal – first place	1904 St. Louis	Horizontal bar
Silver medal – second place	1904 St. Louis	Parallel bars

Anton Heida (also known as Antonín Hejda, born December 24, 1878, Žižkov, date of death unknown) was an American gymnast who competed in the 1904 Summer Olympics, where he won five gold medals. He won the vault, horizontal bar, pommel horse, team competition and all-around titles, becoming the most successful athlete at the 1904 Olympics.

He was a member of American Sokol Organization. He reportedly lived in Philadelphia and Chicago, and later in Prague in the 1920s. He was a physical education teacher. During the World War I, he fought in the Czechoslovak Legions in Russia.

== See also ==
- List of multiple Olympic gold medalists
- List of multiple Olympic gold medalists at a single Games
