= Fencing at the 1924 Summer Olympics – Men's foil =

Men's foil at the Games of the VIII Olympiad
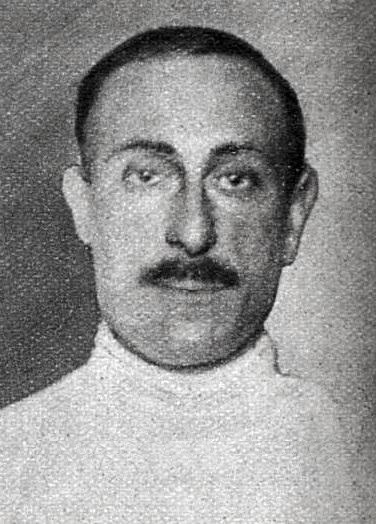
- Roger Ducret
- Venue: Vélodrome d'hiver
- Dates: July 1–4, 1924
- Competitors: 49 from 17 nations

Medalists
| 1st place, gold medalist(s) | | Roger Ducret | France |
| 2nd place, silver medalist(s) | | Philippe Cattiau | France |
| 3rd place, bronze medalist(s) | | Maurice Van Damme | Belgium |

The men's foil was one of seven fencing events on the Fencing at the 1924 Summer Olympics programme. It was the sixth appearance of the event, which had not been on the programme in 1908. The competition was held from Monday July 1, 1924, to Thursday July 4, 1924. 49 fencers from 17 nations competed. Nations were limited to four fencers each, down from eight in 1920. The event was won by Roger Ducret of France, the nation's third victory in the men's foil. His countryman Philippe Cattiau finished second for the second consecutive Games; Cattiau and Ducret (bronze in 1920) became the second and third men to win multiple medals in the event. Maurice Van Damme earned Belgium's first medal in the men's foil with his bronze.

== Background ==
This was the sixth appearance of the event, which has been held at every Summer Olympics except 1908 (when there was a foil display only rather than a medal event). Three of the 1920 finalists returned: silver medalist Philippe Cattiau and bronze medalist Roger Ducret of France, along with eighth-place finisher Ivan Osiier of Denmark (competing in the Games for the fourth time of his eventual seven). Other notable Olympic veterans included 1912 sixth-place finisher Edgar Seligman and eighth-place finisher Robert Montgomerie of Great Britain. A dispute in the team foil event resulted in the Italian team withdrawing from the fencing tournament without competing in the individual foil—the second time in three Games that an Italy–France matchup was prevented by a dispute (France had withdrawn from the 1912 fencing tournament over a rules dispute).

Argentina, Poland, Portugal, and Uruguay each made their debut in the men's foil. The United States made its fifth appearance, most of any nation, having missed only the inaugural 1896 competition.

== Competition format ==
The event used a five-round format. In each round, the fencers were divided into pools to play a round-robin within the pool. Bouts were to five touches. Standard foil rules were used, including that touches had to be made with the tip of the foil, the target area was limited to the torso, and priority determined the winner of double touches.

- Round 1: There were 12 pools of between 2 and 5 fencers each. The top 3 fencers in each pool advanced to round 2.
- Round 2: There were 6 pools, intended to be of 6 fencers each but one of which had only 5 because a round 1 pool had had only 2 fencers and thus could not advance the full 3. The top 3 fencers in each pool advanced to the quarterfinals.
- Quarterfinals: There were 3 pools of 6 fencers each. The top 4 fencers in each quarterfinal advanced to the semifinals.
- Semifinals: There were 2 pools of 6 fencers each. The top 4 fencers in each semifinal advanced to the final.
- Final: The final pool had 8 fencers.

== Schedule ==
| Date | Time | Round |
|---|---|---|
| Tuesday, 1 July 1924 | | Round 1 Round 2 |
| Wednesday, 2 July 1924 | | Quarterfinals |
| Thursday, 3 July 1924 | | Semifinals |
| Friday, 4 July 1924 | | Final |

== Results ==
=== Round 1 ===
The top three fencers in each pool advanced.

==== Pool A ====
| Pos | Fencer | W | L | TF | TA | Qual. | JB | PK | SG |
|---|---|---|---|---|---|---|---|---|---|
| 1 | Jens Berthelsen (DEN) | 2 | 0 | 10 | 4 | Q | | 5–3 | 5–1 |
| 2 | Paul Kunze (NED) | 1 | 1 | 8 | 6 | Q | 3–5 | | 5–1 |
| 3 | Salvador García (ESP) | 0 | 2 | 2 | 10 | Q | 1–5 | 1–5 | |

Source: Official Report, p. 270.

==== Pool B ====
| Pos | Fencer | W | L | TF | TA | Qual. | EF | NN |
|---|---|---|---|---|---|---|---|---|
| 1 | Édouard Fitting (SUI) | w/o | w/o | – | – | Q | | |
| 1 | Nicolaas Nederpeld (NED) | w/o | w/o | – | – | Q | | |

Source: Official Report, p. 270.

==== Pool C ====
| Pos | Fencer | W | L | TF | TA | Qual. | RD | CC | RL | EE |
|---|---|---|---|---|---|---|---|---|---|---|
| 1 | Roger Ducret (FRA) | 3 | 0 | 15 | 11 | Q | | 5–4 | 5–4 | 5–3 |
| 2 | Charles Crahay (BEL) | 2 | 1 | 14 | 13 | Q | 4–5 | | 5–4 | 5–4 |
| 3 | Roberto Larraz (ARG) | 1 | 2 | 13 | 12 | Q | 4–5 | 4–5 | | 5–2 |
| 4 | Eugène Empeyta (SUI) | 0 | 3 | 9 | 15 | | 3–5 | 4–5 | 2–5 | |

Source: Official Report, p. 270.

==== Pool D ====
| Pos | Fencer | W | L | TF | TA | Qual. | FF | RG | HB | EH |
|---|---|---|---|---|---|---|---|---|---|---|
| 1 | Frédéric Fitting (SUI) | 2 | 1 | 13 | 11 | Q | | 5–2 | 5–4 | 3–5 |
| 2 | Robert Montgomerie (GBR) | 2 | 1 | 12 | 12 | Q | 2–5 | | 5–4 | 5–3 |
| 3 | Harold Bloomer (USA) | 1 | 2 | 13 | 12 | Q | 4–5 | 4–5 | | 5–2 |
| 4 | Ernst Huber (AUT) | 1 | 2 | 10 | 13 | | 5–3 | 3–5 | 2–5 | |

Source: Official Report, p. 270.

==== Pool E ====
| Pos | Fencer | W | L | TF | TA | Qual. | PM | KE | JA | SM | KW |
|---|---|---|---|---|---|---|---|---|---|---|---|
| 1 | Pedro Mendy (URU) | 3 | 1 | 19 | 13 | Q | | 4–5 | 5–0 | 5–4 | 5–4 |
| 2 | Kurt Ettinger (AUT) | 3 | 1 | 18 | 15 | Q | 5–4 | | 3–5 | 5–3 | 5–3 |
| 3 | John Albaret (SUI) | 3 | 1 | 15 | 15 | Q | 0–5 | 5–3 | | 5–4 | 5–3 |
| 4 | Svend Munck (DEN) | 1 | 3 | 16 | 18 | | 4–5 | 3–5 | 4–5 | | 5–3 |
| 5 | Konrad Winkler (POL) | 0 | 4 | 13 | 20 | | 4–5 | 3–5 | 3–5 | 3–5 | |

Source: Official Report, p. 270.

==== Pool F ====
| Pos | Fencer | W | L | TF | TA | Qual. | JC | BB | FS | SA | GT |
|---|---|---|---|---|---|---|---|---|---|---|---|
| 1 | Jacques Coutrot (FRA) | 4 | 0 | 20 | 8 | Q | | 5–1 | 5–1 | 5–3 | 5–3 |
| 2 | Burke Boyce (USA) | 2 | 2 | 14 | 15 | Q | 1–5 | | 5–4 | 3–5 | 5–1 |
| 3 | Frederick Sherriff (GBR) | 2 | 2 | 15 | 16 | Q | 1–5 | 4–5 | | 5–3 | 5–3 |
| 4 | Sigurd Akre (NOR) | 1 | 3 | 15 | 18 | | 3–5 | 5–3 | 3–5 | | 4–5 |
| 5 | Gilberto Telechea (URU) | 1 | 3 | 12 | 19 | | 3–5 | 1–5 | 3–5 | 5–4 | |

Source: Official Report, p. 270.

==== Pool G ====
| Pos | Fencer | W | L | TF | TA | Qual. | MQ | JD | FL | JJ |
|---|---|---|---|---|---|---|---|---|---|---|
| 1 | Manuel Queiróz (POR) | 3 | 0 | 15 | 10 | Q | | 5–3 | 5–3 | 5–4 |
| 2 | Juan Delgado (ESP) | 2 | 1 | 13 | 7 | Q | 3–5 | | 5–1 | 5–1 |
| 3 | Frithjof Lorentzen (NOR) | 1 | 2 | 9 | 12 | Q | 3–5 | 1–5 | | 5–2 |
| 4 | Josef Javůrek (TCH) | 0 | 3 | 7 | 15 | | 4–5 | 1–5 | 2–5 | |

Source: Official Report, p. 270.

==== Pool H ====
| Pos | Fencer | W | L | TF | TA | Qual. | PC | PD | DD | ZS | FD |
|---|---|---|---|---|---|---|---|---|---|---|---|
| 1 | Philippe Cattiau (FRA) | 4 | 0 | 20 | 7 | Q | | 5–2 | 5–2 | 5–2 | 5–1 |
| 2 | Philip Doyne (GBR) | 3 | 1 | 17 | 15 | Q | 2–5 | | 5–4 | 5–3 | 5–3 |
| 3 | Diego Díez (ESP) | 2 | 2 | 16 | 15 | Q | 2–5 | 4–5 | | 5–2 | 5–3 |
| 4 | Zoltán Schenker (HUN) | 1 | 3 | 12 | 15 | | 2–5 | 3–5 | 2–5 | | 5–0 |
| 5 | František Dvořák (TCH) | 0 | 4 | 7 | 20 | | 1–5 | 3–5 | 3–5 | 0–5 | |

Source: Official Report, p. 271.

==== Pool I ====
| Pos | Fencer | W | L | TF | TA | Qual. | ESe | GC | AdJ | ESj | FdP |
|---|---|---|---|---|---|---|---|---|---|---|---|
| 1 | Edgar Seligman (GBR) | 4 | 0 | 20 | 9 | Q | | 5–3 | 5–4 | 5–0 | 5–2 |
| 2 | George Calnan (USA) | 3 | 1 | 18 | 9 | Q | 3–5 | | 5–1 | 5–1 | 5–2 |
| 3 | Adrianus de Jong (NED) | 2 | 2 | 15 | 13 | Q | 4–5 | 1–5 | | 5–2 | 5–1 |
| 4 | Erik Sjøqvist (DEN) | 1 | 3 | 8 | 18 | | 0–5 | 1–5 | 2–5 | | 5–3 |
| 5 | Félix de Pomés (ESP) | 0 | 4 | 8 | 20 | | 2–5 | 2–5 | 1–5 | 3–5 | |

Source: Official Report, p. 271.

==== Pool J ====
| Pos | Fencer | W | L | TF | TA | Qual. | IO | DM | BDB | TJ |
|---|---|---|---|---|---|---|---|---|---|---|
| 1 | Ivan Osiier (DEN) | 2 | 0 | 10 | 3 | Q | | 5–2 | | 5–1 |
| 2 | Domingo Mendy (URU) | 1 | 1 | 7 | 8 | Q | 2–5 | | 5–3 | |
| 3 | Balthazar De Beukelaer (BEL) | 0 | 1 | 3 | 5 | Q | | 3–5 | | |
| 4 | Thomas Jeter (USA) | 0 | 1 | 1 | 5 | DNF | 1–5 | | | |

Source: Official Report, p. 271.

==== Pool K ====
| Pos | Fencer | W | L | TF | TA | Qual. | MVD | JF | AG | CG |
|---|---|---|---|---|---|---|---|---|---|---|
| 1 | Maurice Van Damme (BEL) | 3 | 0 | 15 | 6 | Q | | 5–1 | 5–2 | 5–3 |
| 2 | Johan Falkenberg (NOR) | 2 | 1 | 11 | 11 | Q | 1–5 | | 5–4 | 5–2 |
| 3 | Alois Gottfried (AUT) | 1 | 2 | 11 | 13 | Q | 2–5 | 4–5 | | 5–3 |
| 4 | Carlos Guerrico (ARG) | 0 | 3 | 8 | 15 | | 3–5 | 2–5 | 3–5 | |

Source: Official Report, p. 271.

==== Pool L ====
| Pos | Fencer | W | L | TF | TA | Qual. | ED | HC | GdA | TF |
|---|---|---|---|---|---|---|---|---|---|---|
| 1 | Eugène Dufrane (BEL) | 3 | 0 | 15 | 7 | Q | | 5–3 | 5–3 | 5–1 |
| 2 | Horacio Casco (ARG) | 2 | 1 | 13 | 8 | Q | 3–5 | | 5–3 | 5–0 |
| 3 | Gil de Andrade (POR) | 1 | 2 | 11 | 11 | Q | 3–5 | 3–5 | | 5–1 |
| 4 | Theodoros Foustanos (GRE) | 0 | 3 | 2 | 15 | | 1–5 | 0–5 | 1–5 | |

Source: Official Report, p. 271.

=== Round 2 ===
The top three fencers in each pool advanced.

==== Pool A ====
| Pos | Fencer | W | L | TF | TA | Qual. | RL | JC | BDB | JF | PK | FS |
|---|---|---|---|---|---|---|---|---|---|---|---|---|
| 1 | Roberto Larraz (ARG) | 5 | 0 | 25 | 13 | Q | | 5–1 | 5–4 | 5–1 | 5–4 | 5–3 |
| 2 | Jacques Coutrot (FRA) | 4 | 1 | 21 | 13 | Q | 1–5 | | 5–1 | 5–4 | 5–1 | 5–2 |
| 3 | Balthazar De Beukelaer (BEL) | 3 | 2 | 20 | 15 | Q | 4–5 | 1–5 | | 5–3 | 5–2 | 5–0 |
| 4 | Johan Falkenberg (NOR) | 2 | 3 | 18 | 20 | | 1–5 | 4–5 | 3–5 | | 5–1 | 5–4 |
| 5 | Paul Kunze (NED) | 1 | 4 | 13 | 21 | | 4–5 | 1–5 | 2–5 | 1–5 | | 5–1 |
| 6 | Frederick Sherriff (GBR) | 0 | 5 | 10 | 25 | | 3–5 | 2–5 | 0–5 | 4–5 | 1–5 | |

Source: Official Report, p. 271.

==== Pool B ====
| Pos | Fencer | W | L | TF | TA | Qual. | MVD | FL | GdA | PK | PM | HB |
|---|---|---|---|---|---|---|---|---|---|---|---|---|
| 1 | Maurice Van Damme (BEL) | 5 | 0 | 25 | 7 | Q | | 5–2 | 5–1 | 5–0 | 5–0 | 5–4 |
| 2 | Frithjof Lorentzen (NOR) | 4 | 1 | 22 | 13 | Q | 2–5 | | 5–2 | 5–2 | 5–2 | 5–2 |
| 3 | Gil de Andrade (POR) | 3 | 2 | 18 | 20 | Q | 1–5 | 2–5 | | 5–3 | 5–3 | 5–4 |
| 4 | Nicolaas Nederpeld (NED) | 1 | 4 | 13 | 22 | | 0–5 | 2–5 | 3–5 | | 5–2 | 3–5 |
| 5 | Pedro Mendy (URU) | 1 | 4 | 12 | 22 | | 0–5 | 2–5 | 3–5 | 2–5 | | 5–2 |
| 6 | Harold Bloomer (USA) | 1 | 4 | 17 | 23 | | 4–5 | 2–5 | 4–5 | 5–3 | 2–5 | |

Source: Official Report, p. 271.

==== Pool C ====
| Pos | Fencer | W | L | TF | TA | Qual. | CC | JD | MQ | PD | EF | AG |
|---|---|---|---|---|---|---|---|---|---|---|---|---|
| 1 | Charles Crahay (BEL) | 4 | 1 | 23 | 14 | Q | | 5–2 | 5–2 | 5–4 | 3–5 | 5–1 |
| 2 | Juan Delgado (ESP) | 4 | 1 | 22 | 17 | Q | 2–5 | | 5–4 | 5–3 | 5–2 | 5–3 |
| 3 | Manuel Queiróz (POR) | 3 | 2 | 21 | 17 | Q | 2–5 | 4–5 | | 5–3 | 5–3 | 5–1 |
| 4 | Philip Doyne (GBR) | 2 | 3 | 20 | 18 | | 4–5 | 3–5 | 3–5 | | 5–3 | 5–0 |
| 5 | Édouard Fitting (SUI) | 2 | 3 | 18 | 20 | | 5–3 | 2–5 | 3–5 | 3–5 | | 5–2 |
| 6 | Alois Gottfried (AUT) | 0 | 5 | 7 | 25 | | 1–5 | 3–5 | 1–5 | 0–5 | 2–5 | |

Source: Official Report, p. 271.

==== Pool D ====
| Pos | Fencer | W | L | TF | TA | Qual. | GC | RG | RD | HC | DD | JA |
|---|---|---|---|---|---|---|---|---|---|---|---|---|
| 1 | George Calnan (USA) | 4 | 1 | 24 | 16 | Q | | 4–5 | 5–3 | 5–3 | 5–3 | 5–2 |
| 2 | Robert Montgomerie (GBR) | 4 | 1 | 23 | 16 | Q | 5–4 | | 3–5 | 5–4 | 5–2 | 5–1 |
| 3 | Roger Ducret (FRA) | 3 | 2 | 20 | 17 | Q | 3–5 | 5–3 | | 2–5 | 5–3 | 5–1 |
| 4 | Horacio Casco (ARG) | 2 | 3 | 20 | 18 | | 3–5 | 4–5 | 5–2 | | 3–5 | 5–1 |
| 5 | Diego Díez (ESP) | 2 | 3 | 18 | 21 | | 3–5 | 2–5 | 3–5 | 5–3 | | 5–3 |
| 6 | John Albaret (SUI) | 0 | 5 | 8 | 25 | | 2–5 | 1–5 | 1–5 | 1–5 | 3–5 | |

Source: Official Report, p. 272.

==== Pool E ====
| Pos | Fencer | W | L | TF | TA | Qual. | ES | IO | KE | FF | AdJ | SG |
|---|---|---|---|---|---|---|---|---|---|---|---|---|
| 1 | Edgar Seligman (GBR) | 5 | 0 | 25 | 16 | Q | | 5–4 | 5–3 | 5–3 | 5–4 | 5–2 |
| 2 | Ivan Osiier (DEN) | 4 | 1 | 24 | 8 | Q | 4–5 | | 5–0 | 5–1 | 5–2 | 5–0 |
| 3 | Kurt Ettinger (AUT) | 3 | 2 | 18 | 16 | Q | 3–5 | 0–5 | | 5–1 | 5–2 | 5–3 |
| 4 | Frédéric Fitting (SUI) | 2 | 3 | 15 | 17 | | 3–5 | 1–5 | 1–5 | | 5–2 | 5–0 |
| 5 | Adrianus de Jong (NED) | 1 | 4 | 15 | 23 | | 4–5 | 2–5 | 2–5 | 2–5 | | 5–3 |
| 6 | Salvador García (ESP) | 0 | 5 | 8 | 25 | | 2–5 | 0–5 | 3–5 | 0–5 | 3–5 | |

Source: Official Report, p. 272.

==== Pool F ====
| Pos | Fencer | W | L | TF | TA | Qual. | PC | DM | JB | ED | BB |
|---|---|---|---|---|---|---|---|---|---|---|---|
| 1 | Philippe Cattiau (FRA) | 4 | 0 | 20 | 9 | Q | | 5–2 | 5–2 | 5–2 | 5–3 |
| 2 | Domingo Mendy (URU) | 2 | 2 | 16 | 15 | Q | 2–5 | | 5–1 | 5–4 | 4–5 |
| 3 | Jens Berthelsen (DEN) | 2 | 2 | 13 | 15 | Q | 2–5 | 1–5 | | 5–4 | 5–1 |
| 4 | Eugène Dufrane (BEL) | 1 | 3 | 15 | 19 | | 2–5 | 4–5 | 4–5 | | 5–4 |
| 5 | Burke Boyce (USA) | 1 | 3 | 13 | 19 | | 3–5 | 5–4 | 1–5 | 4–5 | |

Source: Official Report, p. 272.

=== Quarterfinals ===
The top four fencers in each pool advanced.

==== Pool A ====
| Pos | Fencer | W | L | TF | TA | Qual. | JD | KE | JC | MVD | RG | GdA |
|---|---|---|---|---|---|---|---|---|---|---|---|---|
| 1 | Juan Delgado (ESP) | 4 | 1 | 21 | 14 | Q | | 5–2 | 1–5 | 5–4 | 5–3 | 5–0 |
| 2 | Kurt Ettinger (AUT) | 4 | 1 | 22 | 17 | Q | 2–5 | | 5–2 | 5–3 | 5–3 | 5–4 |
| 3 | Jacques Coutrot (FRA) | 3 | 2 | 21 | 17 | Q | 5–1 | 2–5 | | 4–5 | 5–4 | 5–2 |
| 4 | Maurice Van Damme (BEL) | 2 | 3 | 20 | 19 | Q | 4–5 | 3–5 | 5–4 | | 3–5 | 5–0 |
| 5 | Robert Montgomerie (GBR) | 2 | 3 | 20 | 22 | | 3–5 | 3–5 | 4–5 | 5–3 | | 5–4 |
| 6 | Gil de Andrade (POR) | 0 | 5 | 10 | 25 | | 0–5 | 4–5 | 2–5 | 0–5 | 4–5 | |

Source: Official Report, p. 272.

==== Pool B ====
| Pos | Fencer | W | L | TF | TA | Qual. | ES | RD | GC | IO | CC | MQ |
|---|---|---|---|---|---|---|---|---|---|---|---|---|
| 1 | Edgar Seligman (GBR) | 4 | 1 | 24 | 18 | Q | | 5–3 | 4–5 | 5–3 | 5–3 | 5–4 |
| 2 | Roger Ducret (FRA) | 3 | 2 | 22 | 17 | Q | 3–5 | | 5–1 | 5–3 | 4–5 | 5–3 |
| 3 | George Calnan (USA) | 3 | 2 | 16 | 21 | Q | 5–4 | 1–5 | | 0–5 | 5–4 | 5–3 |
| 4 | Ivan Osiier (DEN) | 2 | 3 | 20 | 19 | Q | 3–5 | 3–5 | 5–0 | | 5–4 | 4–5 |
| 5 | Charles Crahay (BEL) | 2 | 3 | 21 | 22 | | 3–5 | 5–4 | 4–5 | 4–5 | | 5–3 |
| 6 | Manuel Queiróz (POR) | 1 | 4 | 18 | 24 | | 4–5 | 3–5 | 3–5 | 5–4 | 3–5 | |

Source: Official Report, p. 272.

==== Pool C ====
| Pos | Fencer | W | L | TF | TA | Qual. | PC | RL | BDB | FL | DM | JB |
|---|---|---|---|---|---|---|---|---|---|---|---|---|
| 1 | Philippe Cattiau (FRA) | 5 | 0 | 25 | 10 | Q | | 5–3 | 5–3 | 5–1 | 5–1 | 5–2 |
| 2 | Roberto Larraz (ARG) | 4 | 1 | 23 | 13 | Q | 3–5 | | 5–0 | 5–3 | 5–4 | 5–1 |
| 3 | Balthazar De Beukelaer (BEL) | 2 | 3 | 15 | 18 | Q | 3–5 | 0–5 | | 5–1 | 5–2 | 2–5 |
| 4 | Frithjof Lorentzen (NOR) | 2 | 3 | 15 | 20 | Q | 1–5 | 3–5 | 1–5 | | 5–2 | 5–3 |
| 5 | Domingo Mendy (URU) | 1 | 4 | 14 | 20 | | 1–5 | 4–5 | 2–5 | 2–5 | | 5–0 |
| 6 | Jens Berthelsen (DEN) | 1 | 4 | 11 | 22 | | 2–5 | 1–5 | 5–2 | 3–5 | 0–5 | |

Source: Official Report, p. 272.

=== Semifinals ===
The top four fencers in each pool advanced.

==== Pool A ====
| Pos | Fencer | W | L | TF | TA | Qual. | RD | IO | MVD | RL | JD | KE |
|---|---|---|---|---|---|---|---|---|---|---|---|---|
| 1 | Roger Ducret (FRA) | 4 | 1 | 22 | 12 | Q | | 2–5 | 5–0 | 5–4 | 5–0 | 5–3 |
| 2 | Ivan Osiier (DEN) | 4 | 1 | 22 | 17 | Q | 5–2 | | 2–5 | 5–4 | 5–4 | 5–2 |
| 3 | Maurice Van Damme (BEL) | 3 | 2 | 17 | 15 | Q | 0–5 | 5–2 | | 2–5 | 5–1 | 5–2 |
| 4 | Roberto Larraz (ARG) | 3 | 2 | 23 | 16 | Q | 4–5 | 4–5 | 5–2 | | 5–2 | 5–2 |
| 5 | Juan Delgado (ESP) | 1 | 4 | 12 | 24 | | 0–5 | 4–5 | 1–5 | 2–5 | | 5–4 |
| 6 | Kurt Ettinger (AUT) | 0 | 5 | 13 | 25 | | 3–5 | 2–5 | 2–5 | 2–5 | 4–5 | |

Source: Official Report, p. 274.

==== Pool B ====
| Pos | Fencer | W | L | TF | TA | Qual. | PC | ES | JC | BDB | GC | FL |
|---|---|---|---|---|---|---|---|---|---|---|---|---|
| 1 | Philippe Cattiau (FRA) | 5 | 0 | 25 | 7 | Q | | 5–3 | 5–2 | 5–0 | 5–1 | 5–1 |
| 2 | Edgar Seligman (GBR) | 4 | 1 | 23 | 17 | Q | 3–5 | | 5–3 | 5–4 | 5–4 | 5–1 |
| 3 | Jacques Coutrot (FRA) | 3 | 2 | 20 | 19 | Q | 2–5 | 3–5 | | 5–4 | 5–4 | 5–1 |
| 4 | Balthazar De Beukelaer (BEL) | 2 | 3 | 18 | 17 | Q | 0–5 | 4–5 | 4–5 | | 5–1 | 5–1 |
| 5 | George Calnan (USA) | 1 | 4 | 15 | 22 | | 1–5 | 4–5 | 4–5 | 1–5 | | 5–2 |
| 6 | Frithjof Lorentzen (NOR) | 0 | 5 | 6 | 25 | | 1–5 | 1–5 | 1–5 | 1–5 | 2–5 | |

Source: Official Report, p. 274.

=== Final ===
| Pos | Fencer | W | L | TF | TA | RD | PC | MVD | JC | RL | IO | BDB | ES |
|---|---|---|---|---|---|---|---|---|---|---|---|---|---|
| 1st place, gold medalist(s) | Roger Ducret (FRA) | 6 | 0 | 30 | 14 | | 5–4 | 5–3 | 5–1 | 5–3 | 5–0 | 5–3 | |
| 2nd place, silver medalist(s) | Philippe Cattiau (FRA) | 5 | 1 | 29 | 11 | 4–5 | | 5–0 | 5–2 | 5–3 | 5–0 | 5–1 | |
| 3rd place, bronze medalist(s) | Maurice Van Damme (BEL) | 4 | 2 | 23 | 16 | 3–5 | 0–5 | | 5–0 | 5–1 | 5–1 | 5–4 | |
| 4 | Jacques Coutrot (FRA) | 3 | 3 | 18 | 25 | 1–5 | 2–5 | 0–5 | | 5–4 | 5–4 | 5–2 | |
| 5 | Roberto Larraz (ARG) | 2 | 4 | 21 | 25 | 3–5 | 3–5 | 1–5 | 4–5 | | 5–4 | 5–1 | |
| 6 | Ivan Osiier (DEN) | 1 | 5 | 14 | 27 | 0–5 | 0–5 | 1–5 | 4–5 | 4–5 | | 5–2 | |
| 7 | Balthazar De Beukelaer (BEL) | 0 | 6 | 13 | 30 | 3–5 | 1–5 | 4–5 | 2–5 | 1–5 | 2–5 | | |
| – | Edgar Seligman (GBR) | DNS | DNS | – | – | | | | | | | | |

Source: Official Report, p. 274.
