= Fencing at the 1924 Summer Olympics – Men's team foil =

Men's team foil at the Games of the VIII Olympiad
- Venue: Vélodrome d'hiver
- Dates: June 27–30, 1924
- Competitors: 67 from 12 nations

Medalists
1st place, gold medalist(s)		Philippe Cattiau; Jacques Coutrot; Guy De Luget; Roger Ducret; Lucien Gaudin; Henri Jobier; André Labattut; Josef Peroteaux; France
2nd place, silver medalist(s)		Marcel Berre; Désiré Beurain; Charles Crahay; Albert De Roocker; Fernand de Montigny; Maurice Van Damme; Belgium
3rd place, bronze medalist(s)		László Berti; István Lichteneckert; Sándor Pósta; Zoltán Schenker; Ödön Tersztyanszky; Hungary

The men's team foil was one of seven fencing events on the programme for fencing at the 1924 Summer Olympics. It was the third appearance of the event.

The competition was held from Thursday June 27, 1924, to Sunday June 30, 1924. 12 teams, composed of 67 fencers, competed.

== Rosters ==
Each team could have up to eight members. Four were selected for each match.

Argentina
- Horacio Casco
- Roberto Larraz
- Luis Lucchetti
- Ángel Santamarina

Austria
- Richard Brünner
- Kurt Ettinger
- Alois Gottfried
- Ernst Huber
- Hugo Philipp

Belgium
- Marcel Berre
- Désiré Beurain
- Charles Crahay
- Albert De Roocker
- Fernand de Montigny
- Maurice Van Damme

Denmark
- Jens Berthelsen
- Svend Munck
- Ivan Osiier
- Erik Sjøqvist

France
- Philippe Cattiau
- Jacques Coutrot
- Guy De Luget
- Roger Ducret
- Lucien Gaudin
- Henri Jobier
- André Labattut
- Josef Peroteaux

Great Britain
- Philip Doyne
- Robert Montgomerie
- Edgar Seligman
- Frederick Sherriff
- Roland Willoughby

Hungary
- László Berti
- István Lichteneckert
- Sándor Pósta
- Zoltán Schenker
- Ödön Tersztyanszky

Italy
- Valentino Argento
- Aldo Boni
- Dante Carniel
- Giorgio Chiavacci
- Luigi Cuomo
- Giulio Gaudini
- Giorgio Pessina
- Oreste Puliti

Netherlands
- Adrianus de Jong
- Paul Kunze
- Nicolaas Nederpeld
- Félix Vigeveno
- Henri Wijnoldy-Daniëls

Spain
- Félix de Pomés
- Juan Delgado
- Diego Díez
- Diego García
- Santiago García

Switzerland
- John Albaret
- Constantin Antoniades
- Eugène Empeyta
- Édouard Fitting
- Frédéric Fitting
- Charles Rochat

United States
- Philip Allison
- Burke Boyce
- George Breed
- George Calnan
- Thomas Jeter
- Alfred Walker

== Results ==
=== Round 1 ===
The top two teams in each pool advanced. Each team played each other team in its pool, unless a match was unnecessary as it would not alter qualification. Each team match included 16 bouts: four fencers from one team faced four fencers from the other team once apiece. Bouts were to five touches.

==== Pool A ====
Pos	Team	W	L	BW	BL	Qual.	GBR	ITA
1	Great Britain	w/o	w/o	–	–	Q		
1	Italy	w/o	w/o	–	–	Q		

==== Pool B ====
Pos	Team	W	L	BW	BL	Qual.	FRA	HUN	ESP
1	France	1	0	12	4	Q			12–4
2	Hungary	1	0	9	7	Q			9–7
3	Spain	0	2	11	21		4–12	7–9	

==== Pool C ====
Pos	Team	W	L	BW	BL	Qual.	ARG	USA	NED
1	Argentina	1	0	12	4	Q			12–4
2	United States	1	0	10	6	Q			10–6
3	Netherlands	0	2	10	22		4–12	6–10	

==== Pool D ====
Pos	Team	W	L	BW	BL	Qual.	AUT	BEL
1	Austria	w/o	w/o	–	–	Q		
1	Belgium	w/o	w/o	–	–	Q		

==== Pool E ====
Pos	Team	W	L	BW	BL	Qual.	DEN	SUI
1	Denmark	w/o	w/o	–	–	Q		
1	Switzerland	w/o	w/o	–	–	Q		

=== Quarterfinals ===
The top two teams in each pool advanced. Each team played each other team in its pool. Each team match included 16 bouts: four fencers from one team faced four fencers from the other team once apiece. Bouts were to five touches.

==== Pool A ====
Pos	Team	W	L	BW	BL	Qual.	ITA	HUN	SUI	AUT
1	Italy	3	0	41	7	Q		16–0	12–4	13–3
2	Hungary	2	1	22	26	Q	0–16		9–7	13–3
3	Switzerland	1	2	21	27		4–12	7–9		10–6
4	Austria	0	3	12	36		3–13	3–13	6–10	

==== Pool B ====
Pos	Team	W	L	BW	BL	Qual.	FRA	DEN	USA
1	France	2	0	27	5	Q		14–2	13–3
2	Denmark	1	1	11	21	Q	2–14		9–7
3	United States	0	2	10	22		3–13	7–9	

==== Pool C ====
Belgium won its match against Argentina on touches, 61–56.

Pos	Team	W	L	BW	BL	Qual.	BEL	ARG	GBR
1	Belgium	2	0	20	12	Q		8–8	12–4
2	Argentina	1	1	19	13	Q	8–8		11–5
3	Great Britain	0	2	9	23		4–12	5–11	

=== Semifinals ===
The top two teams in each pool advanced. Each team played each other team in its pool, unless the match was unnecessary to decide qualification. Each team match included 16 bouts: four fencers from one team faced four fencers from the other team once apiece. Bouts were to five touches.

==== Pool A ====
Pos	Team	W	L	BW	BL	Qual.	ITA	BEL	DEN
1	Italy	1	0	12	4	Q			12–4
2	Belgium	1	0	9	7	Q			9–7
3	Denmark	0	2	11	21		4–12	7–9	

==== Pool B ====
Hungary won its match against Argentina on touches, 58–57.

Pos	Team	W	L	BW	BL	Qual.	FRA	HUN	ARG
1	France	2	0	27	5	Q		14–2	13–3
2	Hungary	1	1	10	22	Q	2–14		8–8
3	Argentina	0	2	11	21		3–13	8–8	

=== Final ===
Each team played each other team. Each team match included 16 bouts: four fencers from one team faced four fencers from the other team once apiece. Bouts were to five touches.

Pos	Team	W	L	BW	BL	FRA	BEL	HUN	ITA
1st place, gold medalist(s)	France	2	0	27	5		13–3	14–2	
2nd place, silver medalist(s)	Belgium	1	1	12	20	3–13		9–7	
3rd place, bronze medalist(s)	Hungary	0	2	9	23	2–14	7–9		
–	Italy	DNF	DNF	–	–				
