= Fencing at the 1924 Summer Olympics – Men's team sabre =

Men's team sabre at the Games of the VIII Olympiad
- Venue: Vélodrome d'hiver
- Dates: July 12–15, 1924
- Competitors: 80 from 14 nations

Medalists
1st place, gold medalist(s)		Renato Anselmi, Guido Balzarini, Marcello Bertinetti, Bino Bini, Vincenzo Cuccia, Oreste Moricca, Oreste Puliti, Giulio Sarrocchi; Italy
2nd place, silver medalist(s)		László Berti, János Garay, Sándor Pósta, József Rády, Zoltán Schenker, László Széchy, Ödön Tersztyanszky, Jenö Uhlyarik; Hungary
3rd place, bronze medalist(s)		Adrianus De Jong, Jetze Doorman, Hendrik Scherpenhuyzen, Jan Van Der Wiel, Maarten Van Dulm, Henri Wynoldy-Daniels; Netherlands

The men's team sabre was one of seven fencing events on the Fencing at the 1924 Summer Olympics programme. It was the fourth appearance of the event.

The competition was held from Friday July 12, 1924, to Monday July 15, 1924. 14 teams, composed of 80 fencers, competed.

== Rosters ==
Argentina
- Horacio Casco
- Carmelo Merlo
- Arturo Ponce
- Raúl Sola
- Santiago Torres

Belgium
- Charles Delporte
- Robert Feyerick
- Félix Goblet
- Léon Tom
- Jean-Pierre Willems

Czechoslovakia
- Alexander Bárta
- František Dvořák
- Josef Jungmann
- Luděk Oppl
- Otakar Švorčík

Denmark
- Jens Berthelsen
- Einar Levison
- Svend Munck
- Ivan Osiier
- Peter Ryefelt

France
- Georges Conraux
- Henri de Saint-Germain
- Jean Jannekeyn
- Lionel Lifschitz
- Marc Perrodon
- Maurice Taillandier

Great Britain
- Edward Brookfield
- Archibald Corble
- Robin Dalglish
- William Hammond
- Cecil Kershaw
- William Marsh

Greece
- Ioannis Georgiadis
- Konstantinos Kotzias
- Konstantinos Nikolopoulos
- Tryfon Triantafyllakos

Italy
- Renato Anselmi
- Guido Balzarini
- Marcello Bertinetti
- Bino Bini
- Vincenzo Cuccia
- Oreste Moricca
- Oreste Puliti
- Giulio Sarrocchi

Hungary
- László Berti
- János Garay
- Sándor Pósta
- József Rády
- Zoltán Schenker
- László Széchy
- Ödön Tersztyanszky
- Jenö Uhlyarik

Netherlands
- Adrianus De Jong
- Jetze Doorman
- Hendrik Scherpenhuyzen
- Jan Van Der Wiel
- Maarten Van Dulm
- Henri Wyjnoldy-Daniels

Poland
- Alfred Ader
- Adam Papée
- Konrad Winkler
- Jerzy Zabielski

Spain
- Julián de Olivares
- Julio González
- Fernando Guillén
- Jesús López de Lara
- Jaime Mela

United States
- Laurence Castner
- Edwin Fullinwider
- Ernest Gignoux
- Arthur Lyon
- Chauncey McPherson
- Joseph Parker
- Albert Strauss
- Harold Van Buskirk

Uruguay
- Héctor Belo
- Santos Ferreira
- Domingo Mendy
- Pedro Mendy
- Conrado Rolando

== Results ==
=== Round 1 ===
The top two teams in each pool advanced. Each team played each other team in its pool, unless a match was unnecessary to determine qualification. Each team match included 16 bouts: four fencers from one team faced four fencers from the other team once apiece. Bouts were to four touches.

==== Pool A ====
Pos	Team	W	L	BW	BL	Qual.	ITA	TCH	GRE
1	Italy	2	0	25	7	Q		11–5	14–2
2	Czechoslovakia	1	1	15	17	Q	5–11		10–6
3	Greece	0	2	8	24		2–14	6–10	

==== Pool B ====
Pos	Team	W	L	BW	BL	Qual.	NED	USA	URU	POL
1	Netherlands	3	0	35	13	Q		10–6	9–7	16–0
2	United States	2	1	27	21	Q	6–10		9–7	12–4
3	Uruguay	0	2	14	18		7–9	7–9		
4	Poland	0	2	4	28		0–16	4–12		

==== Pool C ====
Pos	Team	W	L	BW	BL	Qual.	FRA	ESP
1	France	w/o	w/o	–	–	Q		
1	Spain	w/o	w/o	–	–	Q		

==== Pool D ====
Pos	Team	W	L	BW	BL	Qual.	HUN	DEN	GBR
1	Hungary	1	0	15	1	Q			15–1
2	Denmark	1	0	9	7	Q			9–7
3	Great Britain	0	2	8	24		1–15	7–9	

==== Pool E ====
Pos	Team	W	L	BW	BL	Qual.	ARG	BEL
1	Argentina	1	0	9	7	Q		9–7
2	Belgium	0	1	7	9	Q	7–9	

=== Quarterfinals ===
The top two teams in each pool advanced. Each team played each other team in its pool, unless a match was unnecessary to determine qualification. Each team match included 16 bouts: four fencers from one team faced four fencers from the other team once apiece. Bouts were to four touches.

==== Pool A ====
Italy beat Belgium on touches, 50 to 46.

Pos	Team	W	L	BW	BL	Qual.	HUN	ITA	BEL	USA
1	Hungary	2	0	24	8	Q			10–6	14–2
2	Italy	2	0	20	12	Q			8–8	12–4
3	Belgium	0	2	14	18		6–10	8–8		
4	United States	0	2	6	26		2–14	4–12		

==== Pool B ====
Pos	Team	W	L	BW	BL	Qual.	ARG	NED	ESP
1	Argentina	2	0	23	9	Q		10–6	13–3
2	Netherlands	1	1	18	14	Q	6–10		12–4
3	Spain	0	2	7	25		3–13	4–12	

==== Pool C ====
France beat Czechoslovakia on touches, 49 to 43.

Pos	Team	W	L	BW	BL	Qual.	FRA	TCH	DEN
1	France	2	0	18	14	Q		8–8	10–6
2	Czechoslovakia	1	1	20	12	Q	8–8		12–4
3	Denmark	0	2	10	22		6–10	4–12	

=== Semifinals ===
The top two teams in each pool advanced. Each team played each other team in its pool, unless the match was unnecessary to decide qualification. Each team match included 16 bouts: four fencers from one team faced four fencers from the other team once apiece. Bouts were to four touches.

==== Pool A ====
Czechoslovakia beat Argentina on touches, 47 to 45.

Pos	Team	W	L	BW	BL	Qual.	ITA	TCH	ARG
1	Italy	1	0	14	2	Q			14–2
2	Czechoslovakia	1	0	8	8	Q			8–8
3	Argentina	0	2	10	22		2–14	8–8	

==== Pool B ====
Pos	Team	W	L	BW	BL	Qual.	HUN	NED	FRA
1	Hungary	1	0	10	6	Q			10–6
2	Netherlands	1	0	9	7	Q			9–7
3	France	0	2	13	19		6–10	7–9	

=== Final ===
Each team played each other team. Each team match included 16 bouts: four fencers from one team faced four fencers from the other team once apiece. Bouts were to four touches. Italy beat Hungary on touches, 50 to 46, in a match that was the difference in the gold medal standings.

Pos	Team	W	L	BW	BL	ITA	HUN	NED	TCH
1st place, gold medalist(s)	Italy	3	0	28	20		8–8	9–7	11–5
2nd place, silver medalist(s)	Hungary	2	1	33	15	8–8		14–2	11–5
3rd place, bronze medalist(s)	Netherlands	1	2	18	30	7–9	2–14		9–7
4	Czechoslovakia	0	3	17	31	5–11	5–11	7–9	
