= Fencing at the 1924 Summer Olympics =

Fencing at the Games of the VIII Olympiad

At the 1924 Summer Olympics, seven fencing events were contested. A women's event, the individual foil, was held for the first time.

== Scoring controversy ==
After the games, an Italian and a Hungarian settled a scoring controversy with a real duel. Aldolfo Contronei, described in some sources as a 45-year-old fencing critic for an Italian newspaper and others as the captain of the Italian foil team, fought Giorgio Santelli, the 27-year-old son of the Hungarian Olympic team's coach Italo Santelli. Giorgio Santelli had invoked the Code Duello in order to fight in the place of his 60-year-old father. The duel was fought in the town of Abbazia near the Hungarian border with heavy sabers. The duel was terminated after only two minutes of combat time when Santelli must have landed a tierce of quarte in the side of Contronei's forehead.

A further duel resulted when Gyorgy Kovacs, a Hungarian judge at the Games also involved in the causes of the earlier duel, fought one of the Italian team, Oreste Puliti, four months after the Games over allegations made by Kovacs and other judges.

== Medal summary ==
=== Men's events ===
Event	Gold	Silver	Bronze
Individual épée	Charles Delporte; Belgium	Roger Ducret; France	Nils Hellsten; Sweden
Team épée	France; Lucien Gaudin; Georges Buchard; Roger Ducret; André Labatut; Lionel Liottel; Alexandre Lippmann; Georges Tainturier	Belgium; Paul Anspach; Joseph De Craecker; Charles Delporte; Fernand de Montigny; Ernest Gevers; Léon Tom	Italy; Giulio Basletta; Marcello Bertinetti; Giovanni Canova; Vincenzo Cuccia; Virgilio Mantegazza; Oreste Moricca
Individual foil	Roger Ducret; France	Philippe Cattiau; France	Maurice Van Damme; Belgium
Team foil	France; Lucien Gaudin; Philippe Cattiau; Jacques Coutrot; Roger Ducret; Henri Jobier; André Labattut; Guy de Luget; Joseph Peroteaux	Belgium; Désiré Beurain; Charles Crahay; Fernand de Montigny; Maurice Van Damme; Marcel Berre; Albert De Roocker	Hungary; László Berti; Sándor Pósta; Zoltán Schenker; Ödön Tersztyanszky; István Lichteneckert
Individual sabre	Sándor Pósta; Hungary	Roger Ducret; France	János Garay; Hungary
Team sabre	Italy; Renato Anselmi; Guido Balzarini; Marcello Bertinetti; Bino Bini; Vincenzo Cuccia; Oreste Moricca; Oreste Puliti; Giulio Sarrocchi	Hungary; László Berty; János Garay; Sándor Pósta; József Rády; Zoltán Schenker; László Széchy; Ödön Tersztyánszky; Jenő Uhlyárik	Netherlands; Adrianus De Jong; Jetze Doorman; Hendrik Scherpenhuyzen; Jan Van Der Wiel; Maarten Hendrik Van Dulm; Henri Jacob Wynoldy-Daniels

=== Women's events ===
Event	Gold	Silver	Bronze
Individual foil	Ellen Osiier; Denmark	Gladys Davis; Great Britain	Grete Heckscher; Denmark

== Participating nations ==
A total of 240 fencers from 23 nations competed at the Paris Games:

- Argentina (13) (men:13 women:0)
- Austria (5) (men:5 women:0)
- Belgium (19) (men:19 women:0)
- Chile (1) (men:1 women:0)
- Cuba (6) (men:6 women:0)
- Czechoslovakia (7) (men:7 women:0)
- Denmark (11) (men:7 women:4)
- Egypt (3) (men:3 women:0)
- France (24) (men:20 women:4)
- Great Britain (20) (men:16 women:4)
- Greece (6) (men:6 women:0)
- Hungary (10) (men:9 women:1)
- Italy (19) (men:19 women:0)
- Netherlands (17) (men:14 women:3)
- Norway (4) (men:4 women:0)
- Poland (5) (men:4 women:1)
- Portugal (10) (men:10 women:0)
- Spain (13) (men:13 women:0)
- Sweden (9) (men:6 women:3)
- Switzerland (10) (men:7 women:3)
- Turkey (1) (men:1 women:0)
- United States (21) (men:19 women:2)
- Uruguay (6) (men:6 women:0)

== Medal table ==
Rank	Nation	Gold	Silver	Bronze	Total
1	France	3	3	0	6
2	Belgium	1	2	1	4
3	Hungary	1	1	2	4
4	Denmark	1	0	1	2
4	Italy	1	0	1	2
6	Great Britain	0	1	0	1
7	Netherlands	0	0	1	1
7	Sweden	0	0	1	1
Totals (8 entries)		7	7	7	21
