= Fencing at the 1920 Summer Olympics – Men's team foil =

Men's team foil at the Games of the VII Olympiad
- Venue: Gardens de la Palace d'Egmont
- Dates: August 15–17, 1920
- Competitors: ? from 8 nations

Medalists
1st place, gold medalist(s)		Olivier Abelardo; Baldo Baldi; Tommaso Constantino; Aldo Nadi; Nedo Nadi; Oreste Puliti; Pietro Speciale; Rodolfo Terlizzi; Italy
2nd place, silver medalist(s)		Gaston Amson; Lionel Bony; Philippe Cattiau; Roger Ducret; Lucien Gaudin; André Labattut, Marcel Perrot; Georges Trombert; France
3rd place, bronze medalist(s)		Henry Breckinridge; Francis Honeycutt; Arthur Lyon; Harold Rayner; Robert Sears; United States

The men's team foil was a fencing event held as part of the Fencing at the 1920 Summer Olympics programme. It was the second appearance of the event, which had been introduced in 1904 but not held in 1908 or 1912.

Eight nations competed.

== Rosters ==
Belgium

- Léon Tom
- Robert Hennet
- Modeste Cuypers
- Fernand de Montigny
- Émile De Schepper
- Charles Crahay
- Marcel Berré
- Albert Pape

Czechoslovakia

- Josef Javůrek
- Antonín Mikala
- Vilém Tvrzský
- František Dvořák

Denmark

- Ivan Osiier
- Georg Hegner
- Ejnar Levison
- Poul Rasmussen
- Kay Schrøder

France

- Lionel Bony de Castellane
- Gaston Amson
- Philippe Cattiau
- Roger Ducret
- André Labatut
- Georges Trombert
- Lucien Gaudin
- Marcel Perrot

Great Britain

- Edgar Seligman
- Roland Willoughby
- Philip Doyne
- Robert Montgomerie
- Evan James
- Cecil Kershaw

Italy

- Tommaso Costantino
- Aldo Nadi
- Nedo Nadi
- Abelardo Olivier
- Oreste Puliti
- Pietro Speciale
- Rodolfo Terlizzi
- Baldo Baldi

Netherlands

- Wouter Brouwer
- Félix Vigeveno
- Salomon Zeldenrust
- Arie de Jong
- Jan van der Wiel

United States

- Henry Breckinridge
- Francis Honeycutt
- Arthur Lyon
- Harold Rayner
- Robert Sears

== Results ==
=== Semifinals ===
Pool A
Place	Team	Wins	Losses	Qual.
1	Italy	4	0	Q
2	Denmark	3	1	Q
3	Great Britain	2	3	Q
4	Belgium	1	4	
5	Czechoslovakia	0	5	
Pool B
Place	Team	Wins	Losses	Qual.
1	France	1	0	Q
2	United States	1	0	Q
3	Netherlands	0	2	

=== Final ===
Final
Place	Team	Wins	Losses
Gold	Italy	4	0
Silver	France	3	1
Bronze	United States	2	2
4	Denmark	1	3
5	Great Britain	0	4
