= Alexander Bárta =

Slovak fencer (1892–1945)

Personal information
- Nationality: Slovak
- Born: 9 April 1892 Levoča, Austria-Hungary
- Died: Between 1 and 28 January 1945 (aged 52) Hrabušice, Slovakia

Sport
- Country: Czechoslovakia
- Sport: Fencing
- Event: Sabre
- Club: KAC Košice
- Coached by: Šándor Salamon
Medal record
Representing (Slovakia) Slovak krajina
Czechoslovak Fencing Championships
Silver medal – second place	1923 Prague	Sabre
Bronze medal – third place	1922 Prague	Sabre

Alexander Bárta (9 April 1892 – January 1945) was a Slovak fencer. He competed for Czechoslovakia in the team sabre competition at the 1924 Summer Olympics.

== Biography ==
Alexander Bárta was born in 1892 in Levoča, to a Jewish family. In the civilian profession he was an engineer. He started fencing after the establishment of Czechoslovakia under the leadership of fencing master Šándor Salamon, the founder of the first fencing school in Košice in 1900.

Later, together with his coach, he moved to the KAC Košice club. In 1922, Bárta achieved 3rd place in sabre at the Czechoslovak Fencing Championships in Prague, and a year later in the same competition a respectable 2nd place.

At the 1924 Olympic Games in Paris, a team consisting of Jungmann, Dvořák, Bárta, Oppl, and Švorčík took 4th place in sabre fencing. In the 1920s he was the best fencer in Slovakia, and one of the best in all of Czechoslovakia.

He was killed in 1945 in Hrabušice, just before the end of World War II. He did not manage the tense situation in hiding and voluntarily surrendered to the Wehrmacht, who executed him. Later, the surviving family transferred his remains to Levoča.

== International competitions ==
Year	Competition	Venue	Position	Event	Notes
Representing Czechoslovakia
1924	Olympic Games	Paris, France	4th	Sabre team	Men

== National titles ==
Czechoslovak Fencing Championships:

- 1922 Prague: (bronze) (Sabre)
- 1923 Prague: (silver) (Sabre)
