= František Dvořák =

František Dvořák may refer to:

- František Dvořák (painter) (1862–1927), Czech painter
- František Dvořák (fencer) (1871–1939), Czech fencer
