= Thomas Jeter =

Thomas Jeter may refer to:

- Thomas Bothwell Jeter (1827–1883), 79th Governor of South Carolina
- Thomas Jeter (fencer) (1898–1979), American Olympic fencer
- Tom Jeter, fictional character
