= Uhlyarik =

Uhlyarik is a surname. Notable people with the surname include:

- Georgiana Uhlyarik (born 1972), Romanian-born Canadian art curator
- Jenő Uhlyárik (1893–1974), Hungarian fencer
