= Lucien Gaudin =

French fencer (1886–1934)

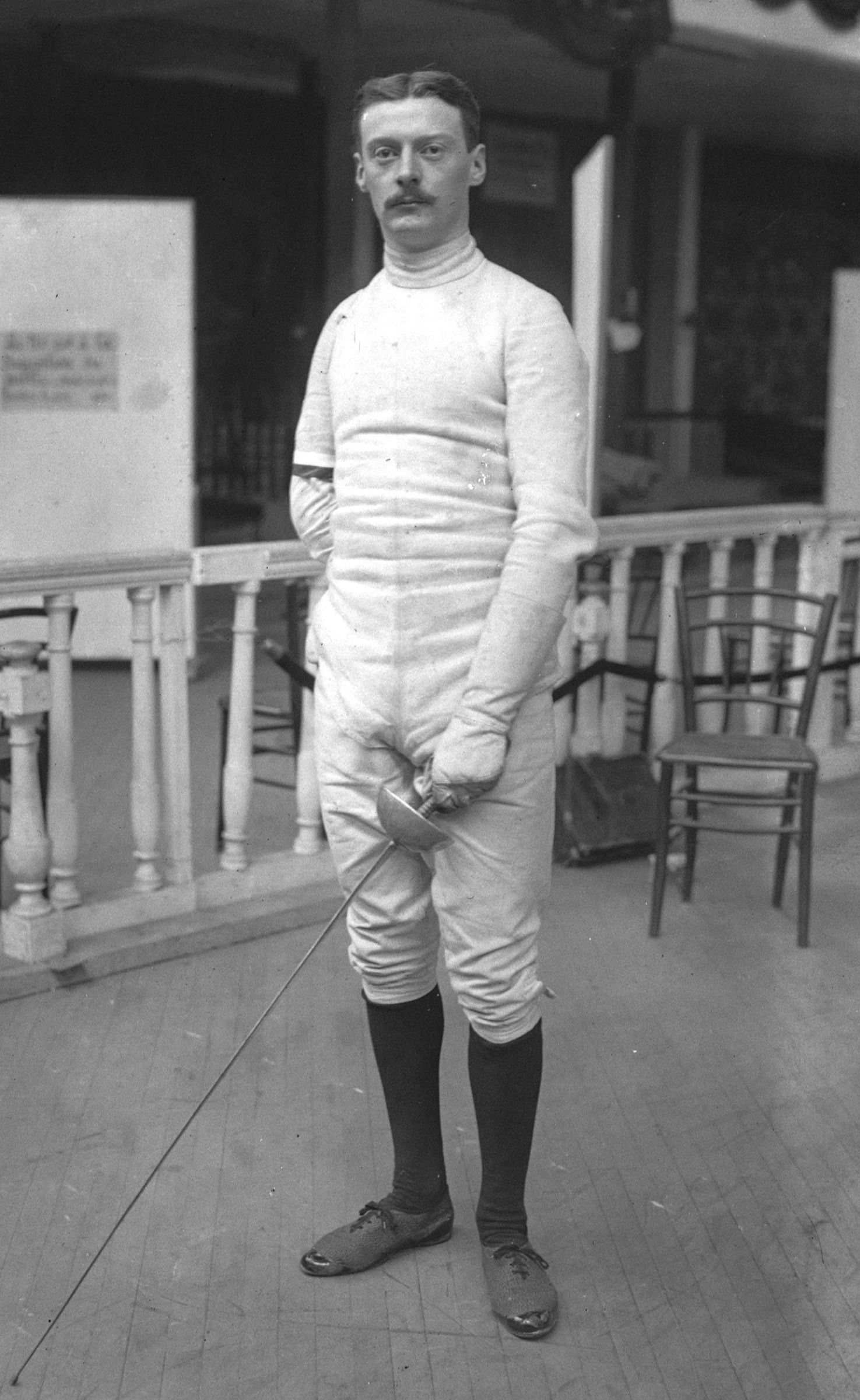
- Gaudin in 1912

Personal information
- Born: 27 September 1886 Arras, France
- Died: 23 September 1934 (aged 47) Paris, France

Sport
- Sport: Fencing
Medal record
Representing France
Olympic Games
Gold medal – first place	1924 Paris	Team foil
Gold medal – first place	1924 Paris	Team épée
Gold medal – first place	1928 Amsterdam	Individual foil
Gold medal – first place	1928 Amsterdam	Individual épée
Silver medal – second place	1920 Antwerp	Team foil
Silver medal – second place	1928 Amsterdam	Team foil

Lucien Alphonse Paul Gaudin (27 September 1886 – 23 September 1934) was a French fencer. He competed in foil and in épée events at the 1920, 1924 and 1928 Olympics and won a gold or silver medal in every event he entered, accumulating four gold and two silver medals total. This record is tied for the best French Olympics performance, matching fencers Christian d'Oriola (four gold and two silver) then followed by both Philippe Cattiau and Roger Ducret (three gold, four silver and one bronze).

Gaudin also won two international champion's titles in épée (1905 and 1918), the European title in épée (1921, first edition) and nine consecutive French titles in foil (1906–1914).

Some sources claim that Gaudin was on the silver-medal sabre team in 1920, crediting him with an Olympic medal in each weapon. However, the IOC medalist database does not award Gaudin a medal in that event, the full results of the event show that he did not fence, and numerous lists of competitors do not include him on the team.

After retiring from competitions Gaudin became a journalist and co-owner of the company Les Films Sportifs, which produced the 1924 Olympic film. Gaudin committed suicide in 1934 when his company went bankrupt.

Lucien Gaudin Cocktail

There is a cocktail named after Lucien Gaudin. It has the bitterness of Campari with gin, a nod to the Negroni, but with dry vermouth rather than sweet vermouth. Then there is the addition of Cointreau. And unlike the Negroni, the Lucien Gaudin at 2:1 gin to Campari is more gin dominant.

- 2 ounces gin
- 1 ounce dry vermouth
- 1 ounce Campari
- 1 ounce Cointreau

A sibling to the Lucien Gaudin is the Gloria, also gin and dry vermouth with Campari and Cointreau.

- 2 ounces gin
- 2 ounce dry vermouth
- ½ ounce Campari
- ½ ounce Cointreau

With equal amounts of gin and dry vermouth, the vermouth in the Gloria becomes the dominant counterpoint to the gin. With the Lucien Gaudin you notice the Campari and Cointreau influence much more, so more of a Negroni riff. The Gloria, with the dry vermouth more dominant is more of a Martini riff.

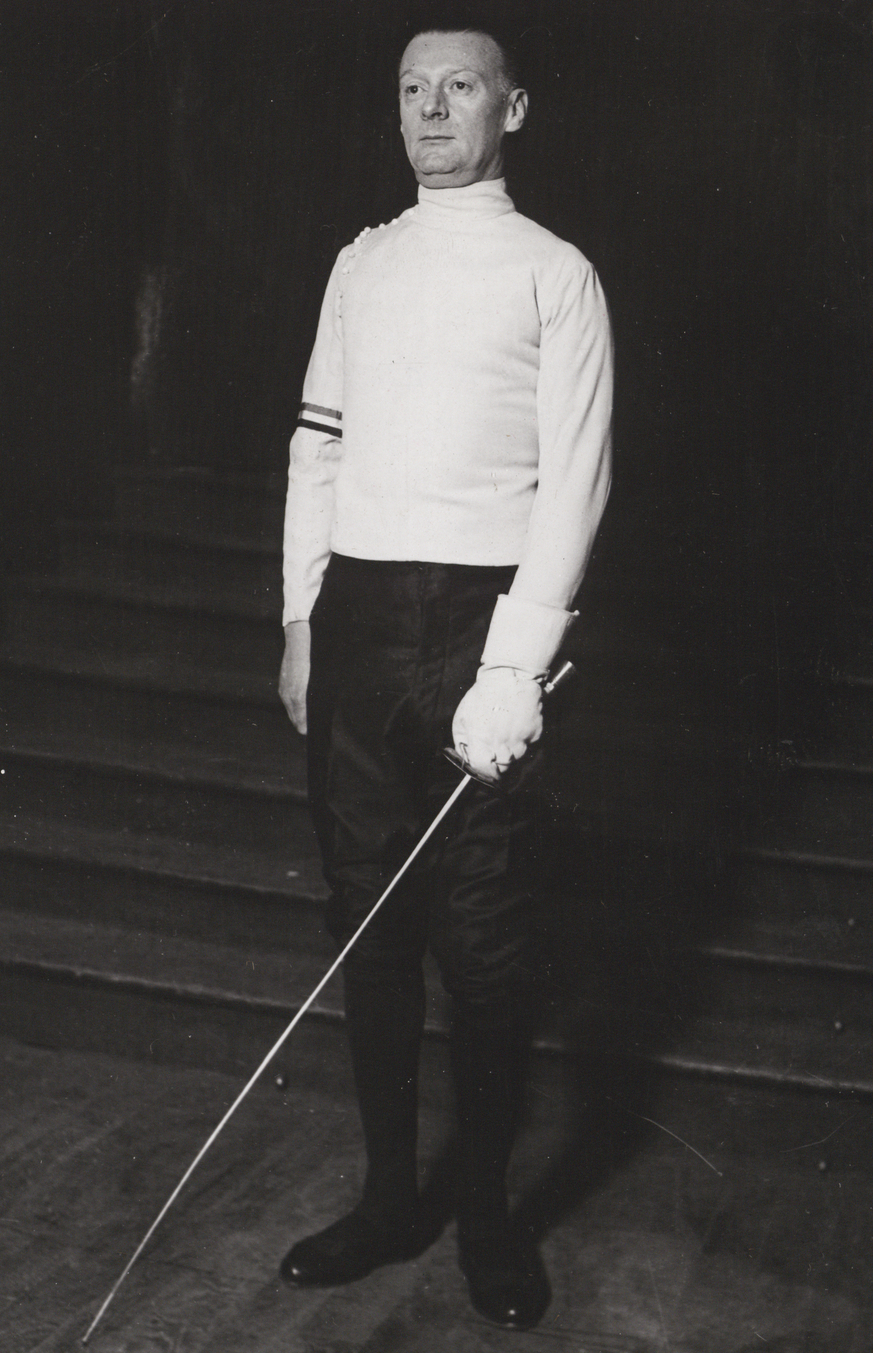
Lucien Gaudin, c. 1932
