= Eric Sjoqvist =

Erik Sjoqvist can refer to:

- Erik Sjöqvist (1903 – 1975), director of Swedish Cyprus Expedition
- Erik Sjøqvist (1900 – 1978), a Danish Olympic fencer
