= Ernst Huber =

Ernst Huber may refer to:

- Ernst Huber (fencer) (1902–1927), Austrian Olympic fencer
- Ernst Huber (painter) (1895-1960), Austrian painter
- Ernst Huber (sport shooter) (1911–?), Swiss Olympic shooter
- Ernst Rudolf Huber (1903–1990), German jurist and constitutional historian
