= Moricca =

- Founded: 1567
- Founder: Giovan Lorenzo
- Current head: Luciano
- Estate: Italy

The Moricca family is a Calabrese family.

The family, settled in Tropea (Calabria), was recon as noble in 1567 in the person of Giovan Lorenzo, confermated noble in 1624 and, afterwards, in 1704. Francesco Saverio's descent transferred, at the beginning of 18th century, in Filandari (Calabria).

== Nowadays ==
Nowadays, Moricca family's members live in Calabria, their land of origin, Turin, Rome, and Brussels.

== Notable people ==
During the 20th century, the main figures of the Moricca family were Umberto Moricca, Latinist and philologist (1888–1948), Oreste Moricca, gold and bronze medalist at the Olympics of Paris in 1924 and General (1891–1984) and Francesco Moricca, surgeon and university lecturer (1932–1993).

== Sources ==
- Libro d'oro della Nobiltà italiana, XVIII°ed., pag. 1934, ed. Collegio araldico, Roma
- Decano nobiliare calabrese 2007
- Annuario della nobiltà Italiana 2007. Libro III – Ordini cavallereschi – Edito da SAGI Edizioni
