= Santiago Torres =

Argentine fencer

Personal information
- Born: 1882
- Died: Unknown

Sport
- Sport: Fencing

Santiago Torres (born 1882, date of death unknown) was an Argentine fencer. He competed in the team sabre competition at the 1924 Summer Olympics making it to semifinals.
