= List of multiple Summer Olympic medalists =

This page is a list of various individuals who are multiple Olympic medalists at the Summer Olympic Games.

== List of multiple Summer Olympic medalists ==
This list shows only the athletes who have won at least eight medals at the Summer Olympics.

Still active

Rank	Athlete	Nation	Sport	Sex	Gold medal	Silver medal	Bronze medal	
1	Michael Phelps	United States	Swimming	M	23	3	2	28
2	Larisa Latynina	Soviet Union	Gymnastics	F	9	5	4	18
3	Nikolai Andrianov	Soviet Union	Gymnastics	M	7	5	3	15
4	Katie Ledecky	United States	Swimming	F	9	4	1	14
5	Isabell Werth	Germany	Equestrian	F	8	6	0	14
6	Emma McKeon	Australia	Swimming	F	6	3	5	14
7	Boris Shakhlin	Soviet Union	Gymnastics	M	7	4	2	13
8	Edoardo Mangiarotti	Italy	Fencing	M	6	5	2	13
9	Takashi Ono	Japan	Gymnastics	M	5	4	4	13
10	Paavo Nurmi	Finland	Athletics	M	9	3	0	12
11	Birgit Fischer	East Germany; Germany	Canoeing	F	8	4	0	12
12	Sawao Kato	Japan	Gymnastics	M	8	3	1	12
12	Jenny Thompson	United States	Swimming	F	8	3	1	12
14	Ryan Lochte	United States	Swimming	M	6	3	3	12
15	Dara Torres	United States	Swimming	F	4	4	4	12
16	Alexei Nemov	Russia	Gymnastics	M	4	2	6	12
17	Natalie Coughlin	United States	Swimming	F	3	4	5	12
18	Mark Spitz	United States	Swimming	M	9	1	1	11
19	Matt Biondi	United States	Swimming	M	8	2	1	11
20	Věra Čáslavská	Czechoslovakia	Gymnastics	F	7	4	0	11
21	Viktor Chukarin	Soviet Union	Gymnastics	M	7	3	1	11
21	Allyson Felix	United States	Athletics	F	7	3	1	11
23	Carl Osburn	United States	Shooting	M	5	4	2	11
24	Carl Lewis	United States	Athletics	M	9	1	0	10
25	Aladár Gerevich	Hungary	Fencing	M	7	1	2	10
26	Akinori Nakayama	Japan	Gymnastics	M	6	2	2	10
27	Vitaly Scherbo	Unified Team; Belarus	Gymnastics	M	6	0	4	10
28	Ágnes Keleti	Hungary	Gymnastics	F	5	3	2	10
28	Gary Hall Jr.	United States	Swimming	M	5	3	2	10
30	Polina Astakhova	Soviet Union	Gymnastics	F	5	2	3	10
31	Allison Schmitt	United States	Swimming	F	4	3	3	10
32	Alexander Dityatin	Soviet Union	Gymnastics	M	3	6	1	10
33	Franziska van Almsick	Germany	Swimming	F	0	4	6	10
34	Lisa Carrington	New Zealand	Canoeing	F	8	0	1	9
35	Jason Kenny	Great Britain	Cycling	M	7	2	0	9
36	Hubert Van Innis	Belgium	Archery	M	6	3	0	9
37	Valentina Vezzali	Italy	Fencing	F	6	1	2	9
38	Nadia Comăneci	Romania	Gymnastics	F	5	3	1	9
38	Ian Thorpe	Australia	Swimming	M	5	3	1	9
40	Kaylee McKeown	Australia	Swimming	F	5	1	3	9
40	Mitsuo Tsukahara	Japan	Gymnastics	M	5	1	3	9
42	Alexander Popov	Unified Team; Russia	Swimming	M	4	5	0	9
43	Ludmilla Tourischeva	Soviet Union	Gymnastics	F	4	3	2	9
44	Anky van Grunsven	Netherlands	Equestrian	F	3	5	1	9
44	Leisel Jones	Australia	Swimming	F	3	5	1	9
46	Giulio Gaudini	Italy	Fencing	M	3	4	2	9
47	Alfred Swahn	Sweden	Shooting	M	3	3	3	9
48	Mikhail Voronin	Soviet Union	Gymnastics	M	2	6	1	9
49	Heikki Savolainen	Finland	Gymnastics	M	2	1	6	9
50	Yuri Titov	Soviet Union	Gymnastics	M	1	5	3	9
51	Kyle Chalmers	Australia	Swimming	M	1	3	5	9
52	Merlene Ottey	Jamaica	Athletics	F	0	3	6	9
53	Ray Ewry	United States	Athletics	M	8	0	0	8
53	Usain Bolt	Jamaica	Athletics	M	8	0	0	8
55	Gert Fredriksson	Sweden	Canoeing	M	6	1	1	8
55	Danuta Kozák	Hungary	Canoeing	F	6	1	1	8
57	Reiner Klimke	Germany; West Germany	Equestrian	M	6	0	2	8
58	Ville Ritola	Finland	Athletics	M	5	3	0	8
59	Elisabeta Lipă	Romania	Rowing	F	5	2	1	8
60	Bradley Wiggins	Great Britain	Cycling	M	5	1	2	8
60	Nathan Adrian	United States	Swimming	M	5	1	2	8
60	Mollie O'Callaghan	Australia	Swimming	F	5	1	2	8
63	Dawn Fraser	Australia	Swimming	F	4	4	0	8
63	Kornelia Ender	East Germany	Swimming	F	4	4	0	8
65	Otto Olsen	Norway	Shooting	M	4	3	1	8
65	Georges Miez	Switzerland	Gymnastics	M	4	3	1	8
65	Ariarne Titmus	Australia	Swimming	F	4	3	1	8
68	Roland Matthes	East Germany	Swimming	M	4	2	2	8
68	Inge de Bruijn	Netherlands	Swimming	F	4	2	2	8
68	Jason Lezak	United States	Swimming	M	4	2	2	8
71	Cate Campbell	Australia	Swimming	F	4	1	3	8
71	Giovanna Trillini	Italy	Fencing	F	4	1	3	8
73	Katalin Kovács	Hungary	Canoeing	F	3	5	0	8
74	Roger Ducret	France	Fencing	M	3	4	1	8
74	Philippe Cattiau	France	Fencing	M	3	4	1	8
74	Petria Thomas	Australia	Swimming	F	3	4	1	8
74	Shelly-Ann Fraser-Pryce	Jamaica	Athletics	F	3	4	1	8
78	Veronica Campbell-Brown	Jamaica	Athletics	F	3	3	2	8
79	Shirley Babashoff	United States	Swimming	F	2	6	0	8
80	Susie O'Neill	Australia	Swimming	F	2	4	2	8
81	Margit Korondi	Hungary	Gymnastics	F	2	2	4	8
81	Sofia Muratova	Soviet Union	Gymnastics	F	2	2	4	8
81	Dmitri Sautin	Unified Team; Russia	Diving	M	2	2	4	8

== Most medals in one individual event ==
This list shows only the athletes who have won at least four medals in the same individual event at the Summer Olympics.

Rank	Athlete	Nation	Sport	Event	Editions	Gold medal	Silver medal	Bronze medal	
1	Isabell Werth	Germany	Dressage	Individual dressage	1992–2020	1	5	0	6
2	Ralf Schumann	Germany	Shooting	25m rapid fire pistol	1988–2008	3	2	0	5
3	Valentina Vezzali	Italy	Fencing	Individual foil	1996–2012	3	1	1	5
4	Ryoko Tani	Japan	Judo	48 kg	1992–2008	2	2	1	5
5	Michal Martikán	Slovakia	Canoeing	Canoe Slalom C-1	1996–2012	2	2	1	5
6	Al Oerter	United States	Athletics	Discus throw	1956–1968	4	0	0	4
7	Carl Lewis	United States	Athletics	Long jump	1984–1996	4	0	0	4
8	Michael Phelps	United States	Swimming	200m individual medley	2004–2016	4	0	0	4
9	Wu Minxia	China	Diving	Women's synchronized 3 metre springboard	2004–2016	4	0	0	4
10	Klaus Dibiasi	Italy	Diving	10m platform	1964–1976	3	1	0	4
11	Viktor Saneyev	Soviet Union	Athletics	Triple jump	1968–1980	3	1	0	4
12	Alexander Karelin	Russia	Wrestling	Greco-Roman 130 kg	1988–2000	3	1	0	4
13	Jan Železný	Czech Republic	Athletics	Javelin throw	1988–2000	3	1	0	4
14	Anky van Grunsven	Netherlands	Equestrian	Individual dressage	1996–2008	3	1	0	4
15	Artur Taymazov	Uzbekistan	Wrestling	Freestyle 120 kg	2000–2012	3	1	0	4
16	Jin Jong-oh	South Korea	Shooting	50 metre pistol	2004–2016	3	1	0	4
17	Michael Phelps	United States	Swimming	100m butterfly	2004–2016	3	1	0	4
18	Michael Phelps	United States	Swimming	200m butterfly	2004–2016	3	1	0	4
19	Saori Yoshida	Japan	Wrestling	Freestyle 53/55 kg	2004–2012	3	1	0	4
20	Gert Fredriksson	Sweden	Canoeing	K-1 1000m	1948–1960	3	0	1	4
21	Pyrros Dimas	Greece	Weightlifting	85 kg	1992–2004	3	0	1	4
22	Peter Hochschorner	Slovakia	Canoeing	Canoe slalom C-2	2000–2012	3	0	1	4
23	Wang Yifu	China	Shooting	10m air pistol	1984–2004	2	2	0	4
24	Ekaterina Karsten	Belarus	Rowing	Single sculls	1996–2008	2	1	1	4
25	Daniel Morelon	France	Cycling	Individual sprint	1964–1976	2	1	1	4
26	Bruce Baumgartner	United States	Wrestling	Freestyle 130 kg	1984–1996	2	1	1	4
27	Imre Polyák	Hungary	Wrestling	Greco-Roman 62 kg	1952–1964	1	3	0	4
28	Dong Dong	China	Trampoline	Men's trampoline	2008-2020	1	2	1	4
29	Florent Manaudou	France	Swimming	50m freestyle	2012-2024	1	2	1	4
30	Giovanna Trillini	Italy	Fencing	Individual foil	1992–2004	1	1	2	4
31	Huang Xuechen	China	Synchronized swimming	Women's team	2008–2020	0	3	1	4
32	Merlene Ottey	Jamaica	Athletics	200m	1980–1996	0	1	3	4

== See also ==
- List of multiple Winter Olympic medalists
- List of multiple Olympic medalists
- List of multiple Olympic medalists at a single Games
- List of multiple Olympic medalists in one event
- List of athletes with the most appearances at Olympic Games
