= László Széchy =

Hungarian fencer (1891–1963)

Personal information
- Born: 18 November 1891 Arad, Austria-Hungary
- Died: 12 September 1963 (aged 71) Budapest, Hungary

Sport
- Sport: Fencing
Medal record
Men's fencing
Representing Hungary
Olympic Games
Silver medal – second place	1924 Paris	Sabre, team

László Széchy (18 November 1891 – 9 December 1963) was a Hungarian fencer. He won a silver medal at the 1924 Summer Olympics in the team sabre competition.
