= József Rády =

Hungarian fencer (1884–1957)

Personal information
- Born: 22 September 1884 Szekszárd, Tolna, Hungary
- Died: 11 October 1957 (aged 73) Balatonkenese, Hungary

Sport
- Sport: Fencing
Medal record
Men's fencing
Representing Hungary
Olympic Games
Silver medal – second place	1924 Paris	Sabre, team
Gold medal – first place	1928 Amsterdam	Sabre, team

József Rády (22 September 1884 – 11 October 1957) was a Hungarian fencer. He won a silver medal at the 1924 Summer Olympics and a gold medal at the 1928 Summer Olympics.
