= Vincenzo Cuccia =

Italian fencer (1892–1979)

Personal information
- Born: 20 March 1892 Palermo, Italy
- Died: 2 March 1979 (aged 86) Palermo, Italy

Sport
- Sport: Fencing
Medal record
Men's fencing
Representing Italy
Olympic Games
Gold medal – first place	1924 Paris	Sabre, team
Bronze medal – third place	1924 Paris	Épée, team

Vincenzo Cuccia (20 March 1892 – 2 March 1979) was an Italian fencer. He won a gold and bronze medal at the 1924 Summer Olympics.
