= Harold Bloomer =

American fencer

Personal information
- Born: September 13, 1902 New York, New York, United States
- Died: September 16, 1965 (aged 63) Riverside, Connecticut, United States

Sport
- Sport: Fencing

Harold Bloomer (September 13, 1902 – September 16, 1965) was an American fencer. He competed in the individual foil event at the 1924 Summer Olympics.
