= André Labatut =

French fencer

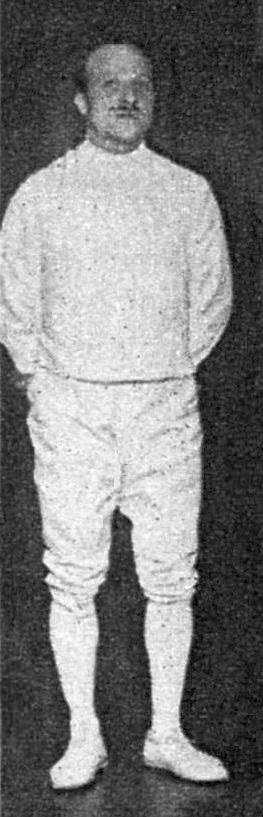

Personal information
- Born: 18 July 1891 Bordeaux, France
- Died: 30 September 1977 (aged 86) Bordeaux, France

Sport
- Sport: Fencing
Medal record
Men's fencing
Representing France
Olympic Games
Gold medal – first place	1924 Paris	Team foil
Gold medal – first place	1924 Paris	Team épée
Silver medal – second place	1920 Antwerp	Team foil
Silver medal – second place	1928 Amsterdam	Team foil

André Jean Labatut (18 July 1891 – 30 September 1977) was a French fencer. He won medals in the foil and épée competitions at three Olympic Games.
