= Lionel Lifschitz =

French fencer

Personal information
- Born: 25 May 1898 Paris, France
- Died: 1 July 1977 (aged 79) Paris, France

Sport
- Sport: Fencing

Lionel Lifschitz (25 May 1898 – 1 July 1977) was a French fencer. He competed in the team sabre competition at the 1924 Summer Olympics.
