= Maarten van Dulm =

Dutch fencer (1879–1949)

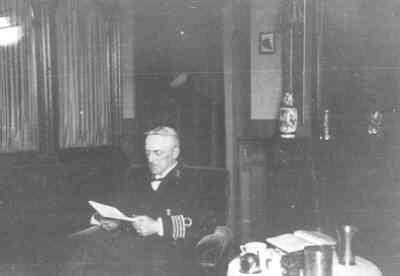

Personal information
- Born: 4 August 1879 Arnhem, Netherlands
- Died: 25 April 1949 (aged 69) Wassenaar, Netherlands

Sport
- Sport: Fencing
Medal record
Men's fencing
Representing Netherlands
Olympic Games
Bronze medal – third place	1924 Paris	Sabre, team

Maarten van Dulm (4 August 1879 – 25 April 1949) was a vice-admiral of the Royal Dutch Navy and Olympic fencer.

Van Dulm participated at the 1924 and 1928 Summer Olympics, in the single and team sabre competition and the team sabre competition respectively. He won a bronze medal in the team sabre competition in 1924.

Van Dulm joined the Royal Netherlands Navy in 1900 and was editor of the naval newspaper (Marineblad) from 1919 to 1922. He became a commander in 1924 and would eventually rise to the rank of vice-admiral. He was commander in chief of the Dutch East-India fleet from 1934-1936.

== Honours ==
- Knight of the order of the Netherlands Lion
- Commander of the order of Orange-Nassau
