= Joseph Perotaux =

French fencer (1883–1967)

Personal information
- Born: 8 January 1883 Nantes, France
- Died: 23 April 1967 (aged 84) Paris, France

Sport
- Sport: Fencing
Medal record
Men's fencing
Representing France
Olympic Games
Gold medal – first place	1924 Paris	Foil, team

Joseph Perotaux (8 January 1883 – 23 April 1967) was a French fencer. He won a gold medal in the foil competition at the 1924 Summer Olympics.
