= Jaime Mela =

Spanish fencer (born 1890)

Personal information
- Born: 17 November 1890 Barcelona, Spain
- Died: Unknown

Sport
- Sport: Fencing

Jaime Mela (born 17 November 1890, date of death unknown) was a Spanish fencer. He competed in the team sabre event at the 1924 Summer Olympics.
