= USS Bunker Hill =

Two ships of the United States Navy have been named Bunker Hill, in remembrance of the Battle of Bunker Hill during the American Revolutionary War:

- USS Bunker Hill (CV-17), was an Essex-class aircraft carrier that fought in the Pacific in World War II and was damaged by Kamikaze attacks
- USS Bunker Hill (CG-52), was a guided missile cruiser commissioned in 1986 and decommissioned in 2023

== Merchant ships ==
- Bunker Hill was acquired by the United States Navy in 1917 and commissioned as USS Aroostook (CM-3).
- Bunker Hill a civilian-operated T2 tanker steamship, sank on 6 March 1964 after an explosion. She broke in two near Anacortes, Washington.
