= Philip Allison =

American fencer

Personal information
- Full name: Philip Whalley Allison
- Born: May 21, 1889 Walla Walla, Washington, U.S.
- Died: July 5, 1982 (aged 93) Salem, Oregon, U.S.

Sport
- Sport: Fencing

Philip Whalley Allison (May 21, 1889 – July 5, 1982) was an American fencer. He competed in the team foil event at the 1924 Summer Olympics.

Born in Walla Walla, Washington, Allison attended Cornell University, where he led the fencing team to a National Intercollegiate Fencing Association championship, the first not to be won by either Army or Navy. He was selected for the United States team at the 1924 Summer Olympics in both fencing and modern pentathlon, choosing to compete in fencing; he fenced on the foil team, which reached the quarter finals. He later fenced for the New York Athletic Club, where he was on 8 teams that won national championships, and placed in national championships as an individual. He was inducted into the Cornell Athletics Hall of Fame in 1996.

Allison was a career officer in the United States Army; he retired as a colonel. He taught at Walla Walla High School. He died in 1982 in Salem, Oregon.
