= Hendrik Scherpenhuijzen =

Dutch fencer (1882–1971)

Personal information
- Born: 3 April 1882 Rotterdam, Netherlands
- Died: 28 June 1971 (aged 89) Amersfoort, Netherlands

Sport
- Sport: Fencing
Medal record
Men's fencing
Representing Netherlands
Bronze medal – third place	1924 Paris	Sabre, team

Hendrik Scherpenhuijzen (3 April 1882 – 28 June 1971) was a Dutch fencer. He won a bronze medal in the team sabre competition at the 1924 Summer Olympics.
