= Guido Balzarini =

Italian fencer (1874–1935)

Personal information
- Born: 21 October 1874 Arrone, Terni, Italy
- Died: 18 April 1935 (aged 60) Rome, Italy

Sport
- Sport: Fencing
Medal record
Men's fencing
Representing Italy
Olympic Games
Gold medal – first place	1924 Paris	Sabre, team

Guido Balzarini (21 October 1874 – 18 April 1935) was an Italian fencer. He won a gold medal in the team sabre competition at the 1924 Summer Olympics.
