= Eugène Dufrane =

Belgian fencer

Personal information
- Born: 2 April 1895 Saint-Gilles, Belgium

Sport
- Sport: Fencing

Eugène François Virgile Dufrane (born 2 April 1895, date of death unknown) was a Belgian fencer. He competed in the individual foil competition at the 1920 and the 1924 Summer Olympics.
