= Bino Bini =

Italian fencer (1900–1974)

Personal information
- Born: 23 January 1900 Livorno, Italy
- Died: 5 April 1974 (aged 74) Livorno, Italy

Sport
- Sport: Fencing
Medal record
Men's fencing
Representing Italy
Olympic Games
Gold medal – first place	1924 Paris	Sabre, team
Silver medal – second place	1928 Amsterdam	Sabre, team
Bronze medal – third place	1928 Amsterdam	Sabre, individual

Bino Bini (23 January 1900 – 5 April 1974) was an Italian fencer. He won a gold medal at the 1924 Summer Olympics and a silver and bronze at the 1928 Summer Olympics.
