= István Lichteneckert =

Hungarian fencer

Personal information
- Born: 17 August 1892 Budapest, Hungary
- Died: 10 November 1929 (aged 37) Budapest, Hungary

Sport
- Sport: Fencing
Medal record
Men's fencing
Representing Hungary
Olympic Games
Bronze medal – third place	1924 Paris	Foil, team

István Lichteneckert (17 August 1892 – 10 November 1929) was a Hungarian fencer. He won a bronze medal at the 1924 Summer Olympics in the team foil competition.
