= Giulio Sarrocchi =

Italian fencer (1887–1971)

Personal information
- Born: 24 May 1887 Rome, Italy
- Died: 18 July 1971 (aged 84) Rome, Italy

Sport
- Sport: Fencing
Medal record
Men's fencing
Representing Italy
Olympic Games
| Gold medal – first place | 1924 Paris | Sabre, team |
| Silver medal – second place | 1928 Amsterdam | Sabre, team |

Giulio Sarrocchi (24 May 1887 – 18 July 1971) was an Italian fencer. He won a gold medal at the 1924 Summer Olympics and a silver at the 1928 Games in the team sabre competitions.
