= Guy de Luget =

French fencer (1884–1961)

Personal information
- Born: 2 February 1884 La Rochelle, France
- Died: 22 September 1961 (aged 77)

Sport
- Sport: Fencing
Medal record
Men's fencing
Representing France
Olympic Games
Gold medal – first place	1924 Paris	Team foil

Guy de Luget (2 February 1884 – 22 September 1961) was a French fencer. He won a gold medal in the foil competition at the 1924 Summer Olympics.
