= Dante Carniel =

Italian fencer (1887–1959)

Personal information
- Born: 13 September 1887
- Died: 2 May 1959 (aged 71)

Sport
- Sport: Fencing

Dante Carniel (13 September 1887 – 2 May 1959) was an Italian fencer. He competed in the team foil competition at the 1924 Summer Olympics.
