= Charles Rochat =

Swiss fencer

Personal information
- Born: 1885
- Died: Unknown

Sport
- Sport: Fencing

Charles Rochat (born 1885, date of death unknown) was a Swiss fencer. He competed in the team foil event at the 1924 Summer Olympics.
