= Gilberto Telechea =

Uruguayan fencer

Personal information
- Born: 4 March 1885 Cardona, Uruguay
- Died: Unknown

Sport
- Sport: Fencing

Gilberto Telechea (born 4 March 1885, date of death unknown) was a Uruguayan fencer. He competed in the individual foil event at the 1924 Summer Olympics.
