= Oreste Moricca =

Italian fencer (1891–1984)

Personal information
- Born: 5 August 1891 Filandari, Italy
- Died: 21 June 1984 (aged 92) Bra, Italy

Sport
- Sport: Fencing
Medal record
Men's fencing
Representing Italy
Olympic Games
Gold medal – first place	1924 Paris	Sabre, team
Bronze medal – third place	1924 Paris	Épée, team

Oreste Moricca (5 August 1891 – 21 June 1984) was an Italian fencer. He won a gold and bronze medal at the 1924 Summer Olympics.

== See also ==
- Moricca
