= Juan Delgado (fencer) =

Spanish fencer

Personal information
- Full name: Juan Manuel Delgado y Hernández de Tejada
- Born: 2 May 1896 Madrid, Spain
- Died: 24 December 1974 (aged 78) Madrid, Spain

Sport
- Sport: Fencing

Juan Manuel Delgado y Hernández de Tejada (2 May 1896 – 24 December 1974) was a Spanish épée and foil fencer. He competed at the 1924 and 1928 Summer Olympics.
