= Luděk Oppl =

Czech fencer

Personal information
- Born: 1888
- Died: Unknown

Sport
- Country: Czechoslovakia
- Sport: Fencing

Luděk Oppl (born 1888, date of death unknown) was a Czech fencer. He competed for Czechoslovakia in the team sabre competition at the 1924 Summer Olympics.
