= Roger Ducret =

French fencer (1888–1962)

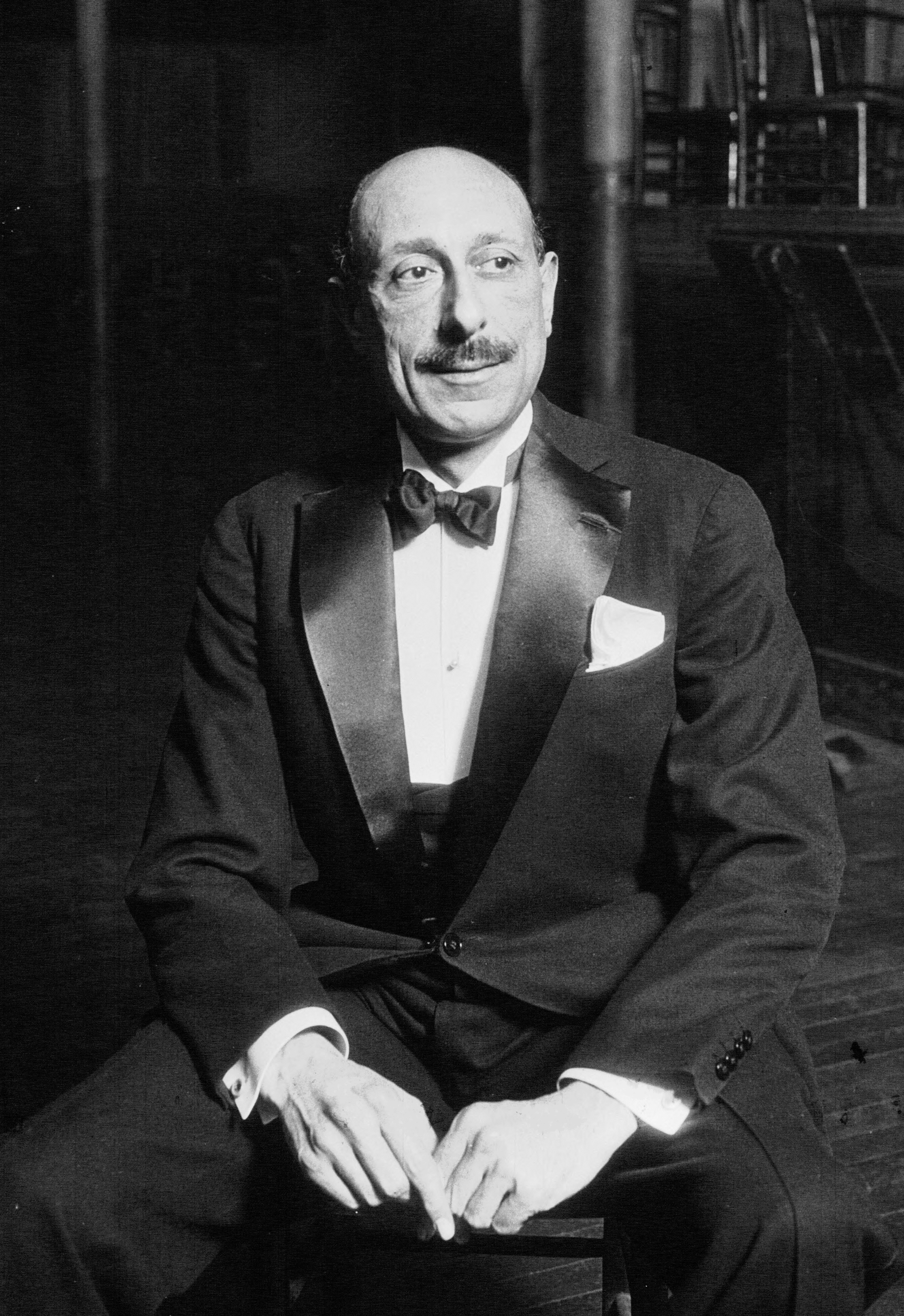
- Ducret in 1930

Personal information
- Born: 2 April 1888 Paris, France
- Died: 10 January 1962 (aged 73) Paris, France

Sport
- Sport: Fencing
- Club: Salle Bouché
Medal record
Representing France
Olympic Games
Silver medal – second place	1920 Antwerp	Team foil
Bronze medal – third place	1920 Antwerp	Individual foil
Gold medal – first place	1924 Paris	Team épée
Gold medal – first place	1924 Paris	Individual foil
Gold medal – first place	1924 Paris	Team foil
Silver medal – second place	1924 Paris	Individual épée
Silver medal – second place	1924 Paris	Individual sabre
Silver medal – second place	1928 Amsterdam	Team foil

Roger François Ducret (2 April 1888 – 10 January 1962) was a French fencer who competed at the 1920, 1924 and 1928 Olympics. At the 1924 Summer Olympics he entered five events out of six and earned a gold or silver medal in each of them, winning individual medals in all three competitive fencing disciplines: épée, foil and sabre. During his time, only one fencer did better: the Italian Nedo Nadi, who won five gold medals at the 1920 Summer Olympics.

During World War I, Ducret was a prisoner of war. After retiring from competitions he worked as a journalist for Le Figaro, L'Echo des Sports and other newspapers.

== See also ==
- List of Olympic medalists in fencing (men)
- List of multiple Olympic gold medalists
- List of multiple Summer Olympic medalists
