= Jenő Uhlyárik =

Hungarian fencer (1893–1974)

Personal information
- Born: 15 October 1893 Levoča, Austria-Hungary
- Died: 23 April 1974 (aged 80) Budapest, Hungary

Sport
- Sport: Fencing
Medal record
Men's fencing
Representing Hungary
Olympic Games
Silver medal – second place	1924 Paris	Sabre, team

Jenő Uhlyárik (15 October 1893 – 23 April 1974) was a Hungarian fencer. He won a silver medal at the 1924 Summer Olympics in the team sabre competition.
