= Zoltán Ozoray Schenker =

Hungarian fencer (1880–1966)

Medal record

Men's fencing

Representing Hungary

Olympic Games
Gold medal – first place	1912 Stockholm	Team sabre
Silver medal – second place	1924 Paris	Team sabre
Bronze medal – third place	1924 Paris	Team foil

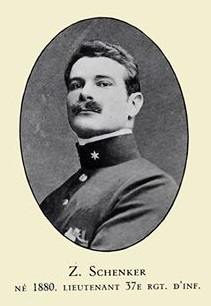
Zoltán Ozoray Portrait

Zoltán Ozoray Schenker (13 October 1880 – 25 August 1966) was a Hungarian Olympic sabre and foil fencer, who won three Olympic medals.

== Early life ==
Schenker was born in Váradszentmárton, Hungary (now Sânmartin, Bihor County, Romania), and was Jewish.

== Olympics ==
Schenker appeared in three Olympiads, winning three medals.

At the 1912 Summer Olympics in Stockholm at the age of 31, Schenker won a gold medal in the team sabre event and placed fourth in individual sabre. In individual foil, he was eliminated in the semifinal round.

At the 1924 Summer Olympics in Paris at the age of 43, he won a bronze medal in team foil and a silver medal in team sabre. In individual events, Schenker placed fourth in individual sabre and was eliminated in the first round in individual foil.

Schenker also competed in individual foil at the 1928 Summer Olympics in Amsterdam at the age of 47, where he reached the semifinals but lost to bronze medalist fellow Hungarian János Garay.

== Writing ==
Schenker was also an author on fencing. He authored A modern magyar kardvívás (Sport Lap- és Könyvkiadó, 1956), Säbelflechten (Corvina, 1961), and co-authored Szermierka na szable with Adam Papée and Tadeusz Friedrich (Sport i Turystyka, 1962).

He died in Budapest, Hungary, in 1966. He was buried at the Farkasréti Cemetery.

== See also ==
- List of select Jewish fencers
- List of Jewish Olympic medalists
