= Philippe Cattiau =

French fencer (1892–1962)

Olympic medal record

Men's fencing

Representing France
Gold medal – first place	1924 Paris	Team foil
Gold medal – first place	1932 Los Angeles	Team foil
Gold medal – first place	1932 Los Angeles	Team épée
Silver medal – second place	1920 Antwerp	Individual foil
Silver medal – second place	1920 Antwerp	Team foil
Silver medal – second place	1924 Paris	Individual foil
Silver medal – second place	1928 Amsterdam	Team foil
Bronze medal – third place	1936 Berlin	Team épée

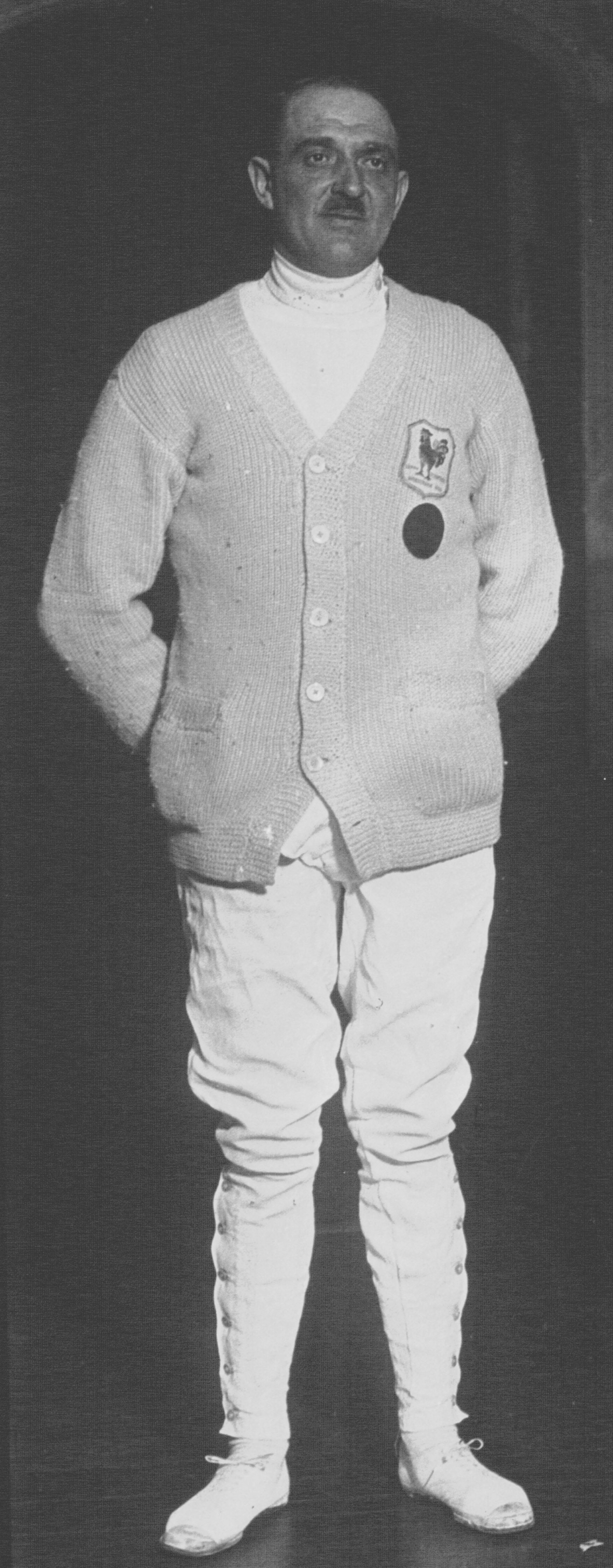
Philippe Cattiau

Philippe Louis Eugène Cattiau (28 July 1892 – 18 February 1962) was a French épée and foil fencer who won a total of eight Olympic medals between 1920 and 1936.

He was born in Saint-Malo in Brittany.

A stadium in the Paris suburb of Villeneuve-la-Garenne now bears his name.

== See also ==
- List of Olympic medalists in fencing (men)
- List of multiple Summer Olympic medalists
- List of multiple Olympic gold medalists
