= Nicolaas Nederpeld =

Dutch fencer (1886–1969)

Personal information
- Born: 11 November 1886 The Hague, Netherlands
- Died: 6 June 1969 (aged 82) The Hague, Netherlands

Sport
- Sport: Fencing

Nicolaas Nederpeld (11 November 1886 – 6 June 1969) was a Dutch foil fencer. He competed at the 1924 and 1928 Summer Olympics.
