= Diego Díez =

Spanish fencer (1896–1936)

Personal information
- Born: 15 December 1896 Madrid, Spain
- Died: 7 November 1936 (aged 39)

Sport
- Sport: Fencing

Diego Díez (15 December 1896 – 7 November 1936) was a Spanish epee and foil fencer. He competed at the 1924 and 1928 Summer Olympics. He died in the Paracuellos massacres.
