= Kurt Ettinger =

Austrian fencer

Personal information
- Full name: Curtis Thomas Eric Marie
- Nationality: American
- Born: 19 November 1901 Vienna, Austria
- Died: 6 January 1982 (aged 80) Innsbruck

Sport
- Sport: Fencing

Kurt Ettinger (19 November 1901 – 6 January 1982) was an Austrian-American fencer and lawyer. He competed in the individual and team foil competitions at the 1924 and 1928 Summer Olympics.
