= Ödön Tersztyánszky =

Hungarian fencer (1890–1929)

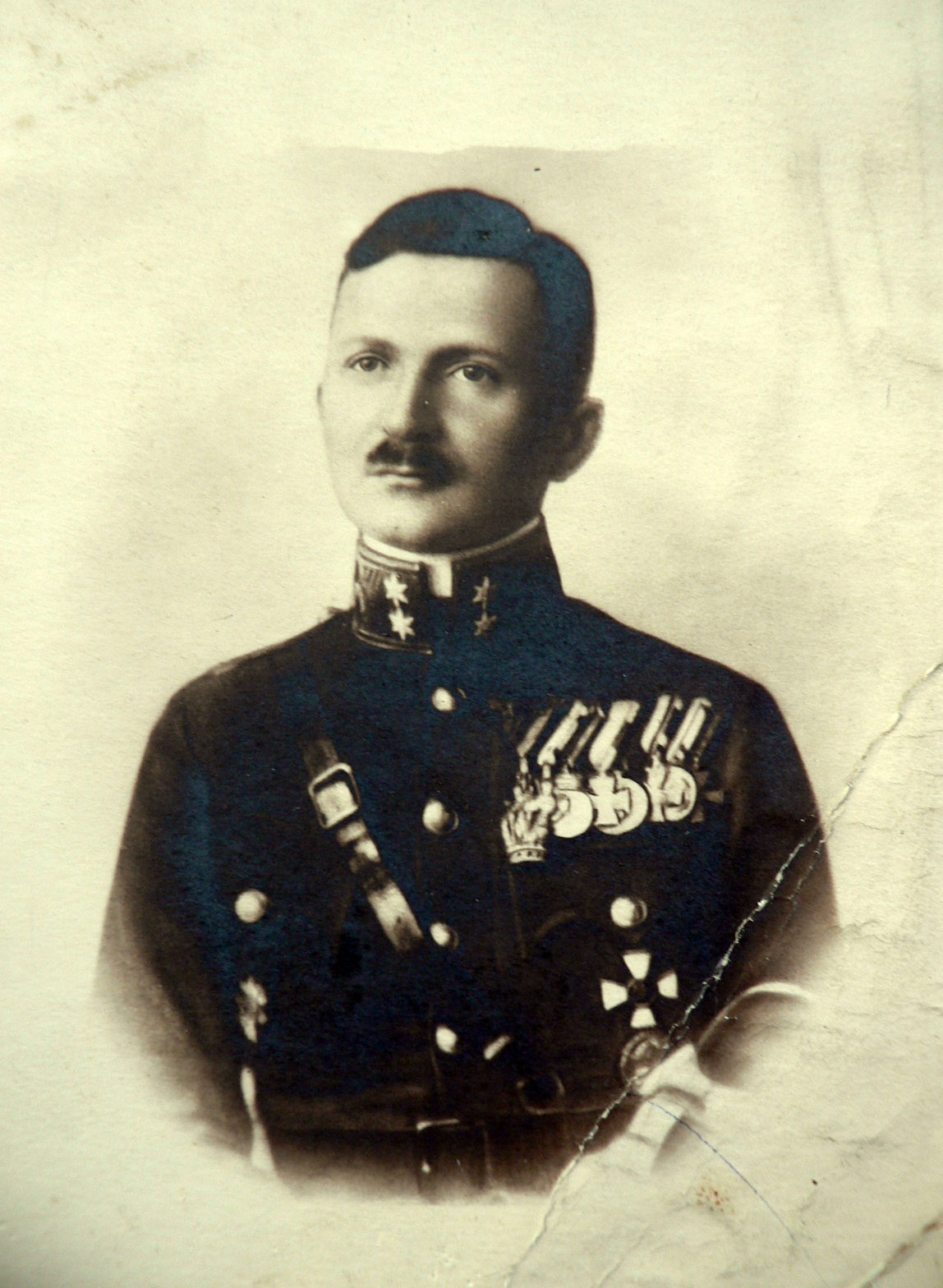

Medal record

Representing Hungary

Men's Fencing

Olympic Games
Gold medal – first place	1928 Amsterdam	Sabre Individual
Gold medal – first place	1928 Amsterdam	Sabre Team
Silver medal – second place	1924 Paris	Sabre Team
Bronze medal – third place	1924 Paris	Foil Team

Ödön Tersztyánszky (6 March 1890 – 21 June 1929) was a Hungarian fencer and olympic champion in sabre competition. He won a gold medal in sabre individual and in sabre team at the 1928 Summer Olympics in Amsterdam.

Tersztyánszky was killed in a car crash outside Budapest.
