= Maurice Van Damme =

Belgian fencer

Personal information
- Born: 1888
- Died: Unknown

Sport
- Sport: Fencing
Medal record
Men's fencing
Representing Belgium
Olympic Games
Silver medal – second place	1924 Paris	Foil, team
Bronze medal – third place	1924 Paris	Foil, individual

Maurice Van Damme (born 1888) was a Belgian fencer. He won a silver and bronze medal at the 1924 Summer Olympics.
