= Alois Gottfried =

Austrian fencer

Personal information
- Born: 30 September 1901
- Died: 28 September 1996 (aged 94)

Sport
- Sport: Fencing

Alois Gottfried (30 September 1901 – 28 September 1996) was an Austrian fencer. He competed in the individual and team foil competitions at the 1924 Summer Olympics.
