= Frederick Sherriff (fencer) =

British fencer (1889–1943)

Personal information
- Born: 8 March 1889 West Ham, London, England
- Died: 31 January 1943 (aged 53) Cosford, Shropshire, England

Sport
- Sport: Fencing

Frederick George Sherriff OBE MC (8 March 1889 – 31 January 1943) was a British fencer who was an officer in the British Army and later the Royal Air Force.

He competed at two Olympic Games, in the men's team foil, at Paris in 1924 and Amsterdam in 1928. He was a two times British fencing champion, winning two foil titles at the British Fencing Championships in 1924 and 1925.

He had served in the First World War in the York and Lancaster Regiment and continued into the Second as a Royal Air Force officer, ultimately Group Captain. He is buried in St Cuthbert's Churchyard, Donington, Shropshire.
