= Jacques Coutrot =

French fencer (1898–1965)

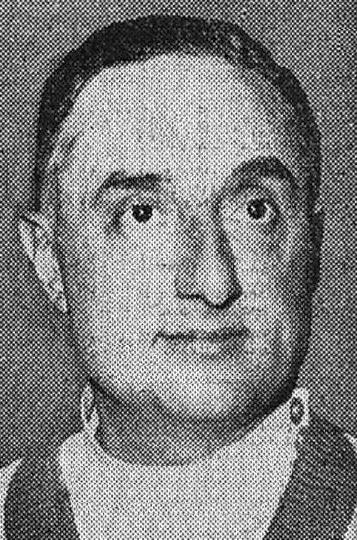

Personal information
- Born: 10 April 1898 Paris, France
- Died: 17 September 1965 (aged 67)

Sport
- Sport: Fencing
Medal record
Men's fencing
Representing France
Olympic Games
Gold medal – first place	1924 Paris	Team foil
Silver medal – second place	1936 Berlin	Team foil
Mediterranean Games
Silver medal – second place	1951 Alexandri	Team épée
Bronze medal – third place	1951 Alexandria	Individual épée

Jacques Coutrot (French: [ʒak kutʁo]; 10 April 1898 – 17 September 1965) was a French fencer. He won medals in the foil competition at two Olympic Games. He was the President of the Fédération Internationale d'Escrime from 1949 to 1952. He competed at the 1951 Mediterranean Games where he won a silver medal in the épée event and a bronze medal in the Individual épée event.
