= Marcel Berré =

Belgian fencer (1882–1957)

Personal information
- Full name: Marcel Louis Berré
- Born: 12 November 1882 Antwerp, Belgium
- Died: 27 October 1957 (aged 74) Geneva, Switzerland

Sport
- Sport: Fencing
Medal record
Men's fencing
Representing Belgium
Olympic Games
Silver medal – second place	1924 Paris	Foil, team

Marcel Louis Berré (12 November 1882 – 27 October 1957) was a Belgian fencer. He won a silver medal in the team foil competition at the 1924 Summer Olympics.
