= Paul Kunze =

Dutch fencer (1904–1983)

Personal information
- Born: 25 December 1904 Amsterdam, Netherlands
- Died: 16 July 1983 (aged 78) Bergen, Netherlands

Sport
- Sport: Fencing

Paul Kunze (25 December 1904 – 16 July 1983) was a Dutch fencer. He competed at three Olympic Games.
