= John Albaret =

Swiss fencer (1878–1969)

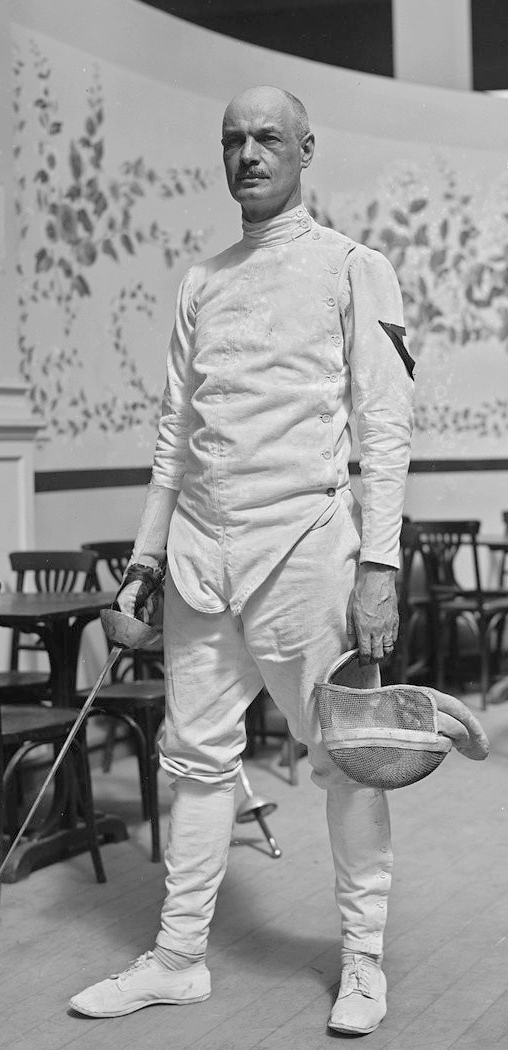
- John Albaret at the 1922 European Championships

Personal information
- Born: 13 October 1878 Geneva, Switzerland
- Died: 18 July 1969 (aged 90)

Sport
- Sport: Fencing
- Club: SEG, Genève

John Laurent Albaret (13 October 1878 – 18 July 1969) was a Swiss fencer. He competed at the 1920, 1924 and 1928 Summer Olympics in individual and team épée and foil events. His best result was fifth place in the team épée in 1920.
