= Burke Boyce =

American fencer

Personal information
- Born: June 19, 1901 St. Louis, Missouri, United States
- Died: December 15, 1969 (aged 67) Flagstaff, Arizona, United States

Sport
- Sport: Fencing
- College team: Harvard University

Burke Boyce (June 19, 1901 – December 15, 1969) was an American fencer. He competed in the individual and team foil events at the 1924 Summer Olympics. He graduated from Harvard University.
