= Thomas Jeter (fencer) =

American fencer

Personal information
- Full name: Thomas Powers Jeter
- Born: August 25, 1898 Florence, Alabama, United States
- Died: October 23, 1979 (aged 81) San Diego, California, United States

Sport
- Sport: Fencing

Thomas Powers Jeter (August 30, 1898 – October 23, 1979) was an American fencer. He competed in the individual and team foil events at the 1924 Summer Olympics.

== Background ==
Jeter was a military officer and pilot in the United States Navy. He received the Legion of Merit for his service in the Pacific from March to June 1944, having served as a commanding officer on the USS Bunker Hill during World War II.
