= Salvador García (fencer) =

Spanish fencer

Personal information
- Born: 24 August 1899

Sport
- Sport: Fencing

Salvador García (born 24 August 1899, date of death unknown) was a Spanish fencer. He competed in the individual and team foil events at the 1924 Summer Olympics.
