= Pedro Mendy =

Uruguayan fencer

Personal information
- Born: 1872
- Died: 21 October 1943 (aged 70–71)

Sport
- Sport: Fencing

Pedro Mendy (1872 – 21 October 1943) was a Uruguayan fencer. He competed in the individual and team sabre and individual foil events at the 1924 Summer Olympics.
