= Edgar Seligman =

British painter and fencer (1867–1958)

- Seligman in fencing top circa 1907

Personal information
- Full name: Edgar Isaac Seligman
- Nationality: British
- Born: 14 April 1867 San Francisco, California
- Died: 27 September 1958 (aged 91) Kensington, London
- Occupations: Artist, Painter and Fencer
- Height: 174 cm (5 ft 9 in)
- Spouse: Georgette Alice (m. 1909)

Sport
- Events: Fencing, épée, foil
- Club: Salle Bertrand; F. G. McPherson's School; British Fenc. Assoc. (All London)
Medal record
Men's fencing
Representing Great Britain
Olympic Games
Silver medal – second place	1908 London	Team épée
Silver medal – second place	1912 Stockholm	Team épée
Intercalated Games
Silver medal – second place	1906 Athens	Team épée

Edgar Isaac Seligman (14 April 1867 – 27 September 1958) was an accomplished American-born British painter, who exhibited at the Fine Art Society and Royal Academy and was a highly competitive épée, foil, and sabre fencer.

Seligman competed in five Olympiads and won the silver medal in team épée competition as a member of the British fencing team in 1906 (Intercalated), 1908, and 1912, despite not making his Olympic debut until age 39. At the British Fencing Championships, Seligman was a strong fencer on all three weapons, épée, sabre, and foil, and was the only person to have won the British title in each weapon at least twice. Recognized as a team leader and champion, he served as the British fencing team's Captain from 1912 to 1924.

== Biography ==
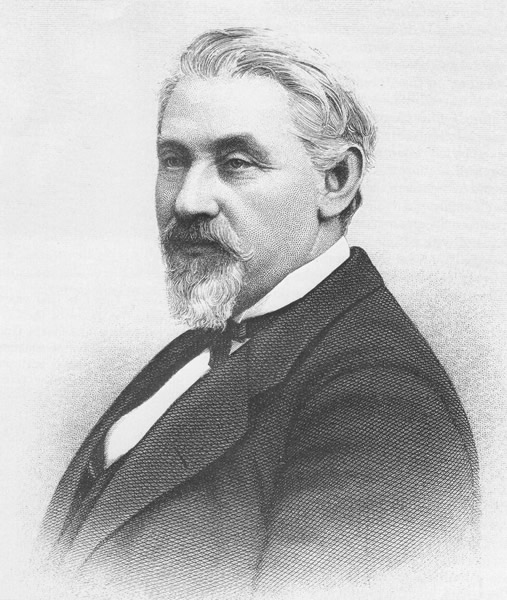
Banker Joseph Seligman, Edgar's Uncle

Seligman was born in San Francisco, California, in the United States, to German-American parents, and was Jewish. His father was Leopold Seligman, a businessman and banker who headed a London banking firm. Edgar was a nephew, as his father Leopold was a brother to the founders of the New York banking firm J. & W. Seligman & Co., initially headed primarily by Bavarian immigrant Joseph Seligman, and his brothers Jesse, James, Edgar's father Leopold, William and Henry. In 1851, Leopold and his brothers set up a store in San Francisco, the city where Edgar was born in 1867. Edgar's immediate family, headed by his father Leopold and his mother Margeurite, moved to London, England, around 1869, when he was two.

With the Imperial Yeomanry, in his early thirties, Seligman took part in the Boer War, occurring between 1899 and 1902. His brother was Brigadier General Herbert Seligman who served in the Royal Artillery.

Edgar became a British citizen by naturalisation around 1905 at the age of 38, which required him to forswear allegiance to the United States. As he travelled relatively often, particularly as a member of the British Fencing team, British citizenship was simpler to maintain, though he retained respect for his native country and their athletes.

=== Marriage ===
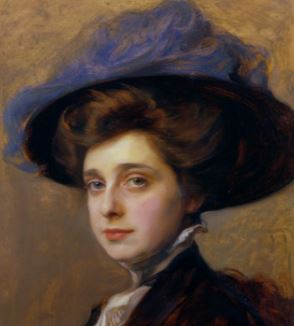
Edgar's wife Georgette A. Mosenthal at 28, by P. A. de Lazlo, 1907

Having established a national reputation in amateur fencing in the 1906 Athens Olympics, on October 12, 1909, Seligman was married to George Joseph Mosenthal's daughter, Georgette Alice Henriette Mosenthal. They were married with a traditional ceremony at the Synagogue at 34 Upper Berkely Street, one of the oldest in Great Britain, now known as the West London Synagogue. Edgar was forty-two, and Georgette was twelve years younger, and both had lived and possibly met on Queen's Gate, a street in South Kensington, London. The reception was at the home of Mrs. George (Margeurite Biedermann b. 1859 in Paris) Mosenthal, the Bride's mother, at 190 Queen's Gate, London. Seligman's brother, then Captain H.S. Seligman of the Royal Horse Artillery was best man. In 1907, Georgette was the subject of a portrait in oil by P. A. Laszlo. Her father George Joseph Samuel Mosenthal (1852-1912) was a prominent Jewish businessman and merchant, active in London high society, who was a member of an association of Capetown Merchants that ruled on the continuation of mail to England's Cape Colony in South Africa in 1886.

==== Wife's family ====
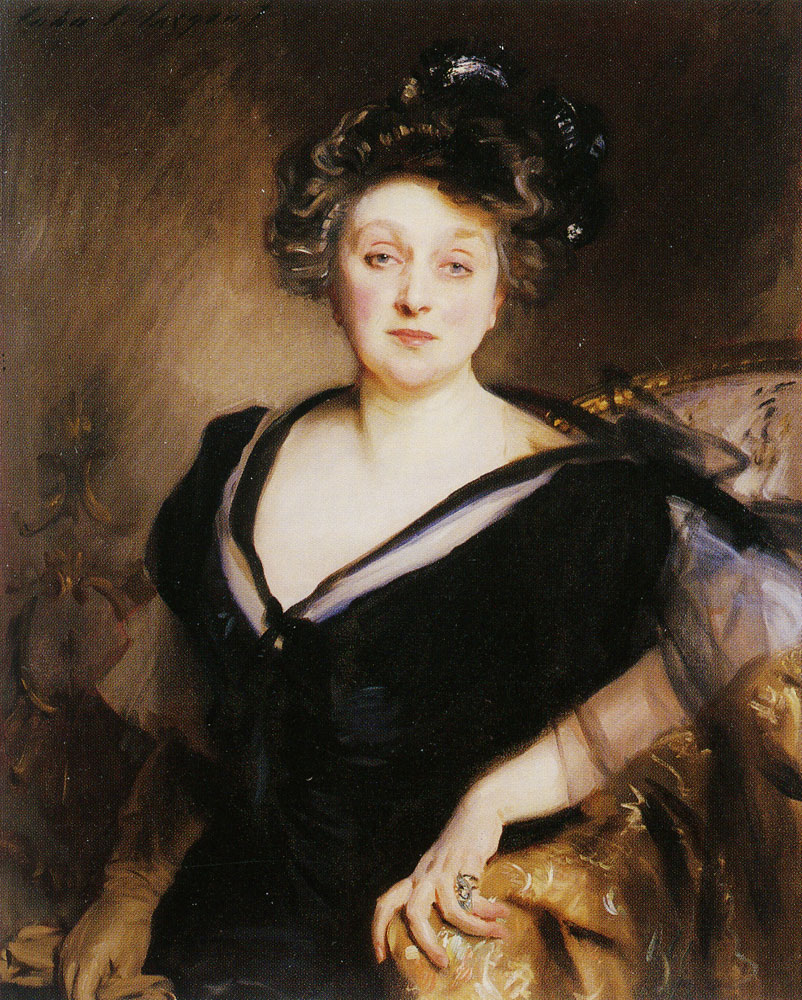
Edgar's mother-in-law, Mrs. George Mosenthal (1906), around age 47, by John Singer Sargent at the National Portrait Gallery

George Joseph Samuel Mosenthal (b. 1853, Graaff-Reinet, South Africa), was Edgar's father-in-law and the son of Adolph Mosenthal. Adolph was the brother of Joseph Mosenthal, an 1839 German-Jewish immigrant to Capetown, South Africa. Adolph, with his brothers Joseph and later Julius set up the business Mosenthal Brothers in the Capetown area in the mid-1800's. They eventually established themselves in agricultural export including goats, sheep, and ostriches, and evolved into gold and diamond mining in association with several Consolidated Mines including DeBeers. In September 1912, when George Joseph Samuel Mosenthal died in Middlesex, outside of London, his fortune was estimated at £500,000, very roughly £73 million or $95.7 million in today's currency. Georgette's mother, Mrs. George (Margeurite Biedermann) Mosenthal (b. 1859, Paris), had been the subject of a portrait in oil by American Painter John Singer Sargent, now on display at the National Portrait Gallery in Washington, D.C. Around 1890, she had been painted in white in a full-length portrait by Jewish London painter and Royal Academician Solomon Joseph Solomon.

=== As Fencer ===
Seligman attended Salle Bertrand in London, a well established fencing school founded in the late nineteenth century by fencing master Baptise Bertrand originally on London's Warwick Street. Seligman would attend fencing school and compete or judge occasional competitions at Salle Bertrand's as late as 1928, and London's F. McPherson's School of Arms in Westminster as early as 1906, and stay active as a competitor at least through the 1920s with his last competitive Olympics in 1924 at the age of 57. Military teams often competed at Bertrand's and McPherson's, and the competitions were often arranged by the British Fencing Association. Seligman acted as a fencing referee and judge in the 1924 and 1928 Olympics, continuing his participation in the sport into his sixties.

=== As Painter ===
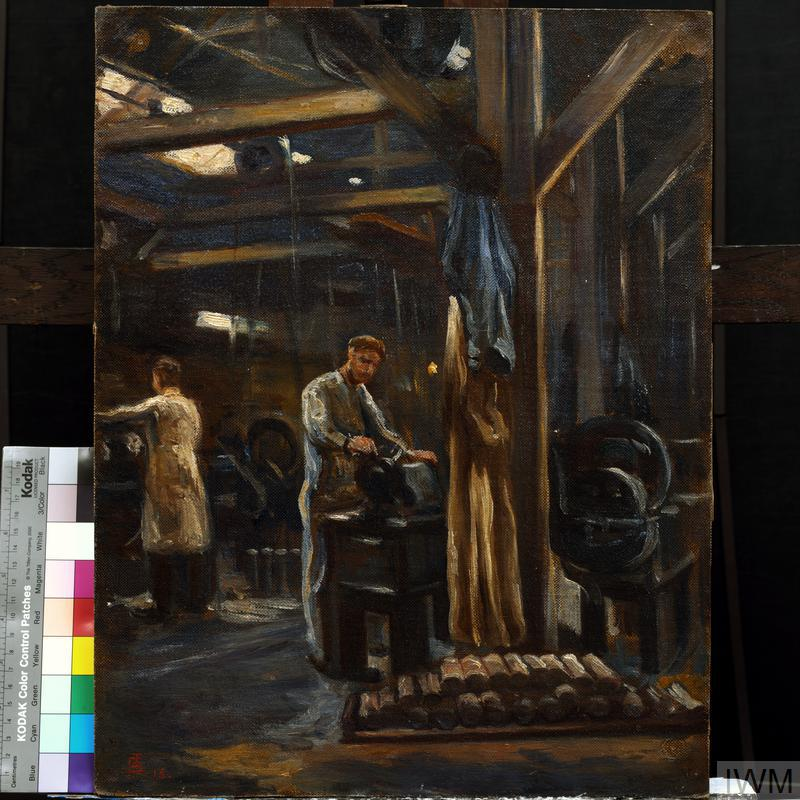
Belgian Steel Factory, Goldhawk Road, W12 - Workers (1918), painting by Edgar Seligman

As a painter, Seligman had artwork shown at the Fine Art Society and Royal Academy. He exhibited 52 paintings at the Fine Art Society, London, and two at the Royal Academy. He had painting entries in both the 1928 and 1932 Olympics. One of his earliest exhibits was at London's Mendoza gallery in 1907. He had a studio in Kensington's Roland Gardens. In an interview, he stated he did not begin to exhibit his work until around 1906, though he certainly had painted extensively before then. Many of his works depicted common men and women at work.

== Fencing career ==
=== British Championships ===
At the British Championships, Seligman won the epee event in 1904 and 1906. He later won the foil event from 1906 to 1907 while also winning the sabre event in 1923 and 1924.

=== Medal, 1906 Intercalated Games ===
At the 1906 Intercalated Games in Athens, Seligman competed in the team épée with Great Britain and won a silver medal in the team competition with the French team taking first. The English team included members of the British military and a few members of the aristocracy. After his match on the second day of the games, Seligman was personally summoned and congratulated by King George V of England, likely with other team members, on April 24, 1906. King George attended with King Edward and the Crown Prince of Greece. Members of the Press considered the 1906 Games an official Olympic event, though they were later not recognized as an official Olympics by the International Olympic Committee.

=== Medal, 1908 London Olympic Games ===
At the 1908 Summer Olympics, Seligman reached the first round in the individual épée while placing in second for a silver medal for team competition with the British team in épée, while the French team took first place.

=== Medal, 1912 Stockholm Olympic Games ===
As captain, Seligman competed in three events during the 1912 Summer Olympics. In individual events, Seligman came in sixth in both the foil and épée. With the British team, Seligman took a second place silver in the team épée, with the Belgian team taking first.

=== 1920 Antwerp Games ===
Seligman competed at the 1920 Antwerp Games as captain of the British fencing team. During these games, the British team placed 5th in the épée and 7th in the foil.

=== 1924 Paris Olympic Games ===
Seligman returned as captain of the British fencing team at the 1924 Summer Olympics. In individual events, Seligman reached the semifinals in the sabre and the final in the foil. For team events, Seligman and Great Britain made it to the quarterfinals. Seligman did not compete in the sabre or epee team events for Great Britain due to a leg injury that occurred in the foil event.

=== 1928 and 1932 Olympic Games ===
At the Art competitions at the 1928 Summer Olympics and Art competitions at the 1932 Summer Olympics, Seligman competed in the Mixed Painting Art Competitions. At the 1928 Olympics he was a jury president, judging several of the Fencing competitions in foil and épée.

He died on 27 September 1958, in Kensington, London, where he had lived nearly all of his life. He bequeathed his collection of over 5000 16th and 17th century portrait engravings to the Victoria and Albert Museum. Best known in his collection are the works of 17th century French engraver Robert Nanteuil.

== See also ==
- List of select Jewish fencers
- List of Jewish Olympic medalists
