= Geoffrey Doyne =

British fencer (1886–1959)

Personal information
- Full name: Philip Geoffrey Doyne
- Born: 31 October 1886 Oxford, Oxfordshire, England
- Died: 22 January 1959 (aged 72) Henley-on-Thames, Oxfordshire, England

Sport
- Sport: Fencing

Philip Geoffrey Doyne (31 October 1886 – 22 January 1959) was a British fencer. He competed at the 1920 and 1924 Olympic Games. Doyne was a two times British fencing champion, winning two foil titles at the British Fencing Championships, from 1912 to 1920.
