= Ernst Huber (fencer) =

Austrian fencer

Personal information
- Born: 5 October 1902
- Died: 25 December 1927 (aged 25)

Sport
- Sport: Fencing

Ernst Huber (5 October 1902 – 25 December 1927) was an Austrian fencer who competed in the individual and team foil competitions at the 1924 Summer Olympics.
