= Sándor Pósta =

Hungarian fencer (1888–1952)

- Born: 25 September 1888; Pánd, Hungary
- Died: 4 November 1952 (aged 64); Budapest, Hungary

Sándor Pósta
Medal record

Representing Hungary

Men's Fencing

Olympic Games
Gold medal – first place	1924 Paris	Sabre Individual
Silver medal – second place	1924 Paris	Sabre Team
Bronze medal – third place	1924 Paris	Foil Team

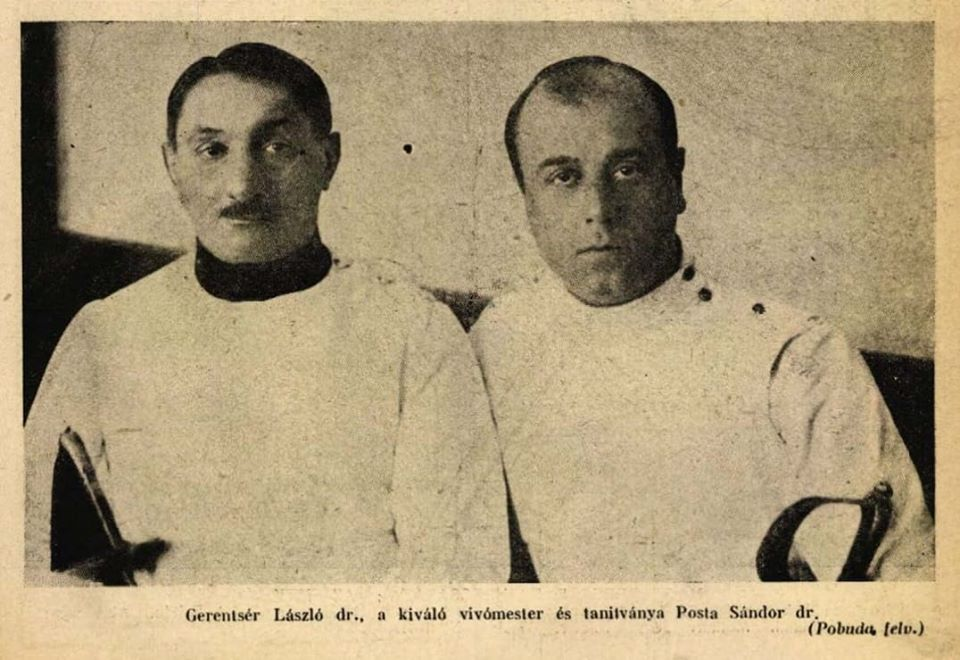
Sándor Pósta

Sandor Posta (25 September 1888 – 4 November 1952) was a Hungarian fencer and Olympic champion in the sabre competition.

Sandor Posta's early fencing career was interrupted by service in the First World War. During fighting in the trenches he sustained a serious hip injury which threatened his sporting career. Following an operation in Vienna he was able to return to the sport. He was very superstitious and would not talk to anyone directly before or after a fight. His statement to the press following his Olympic win was slid under a hotel room door on the journalist's calling card.

He received a gold medal in sabre individual at the 1924 Summer Olympics in Paris, and a silver medal in team (sabre). He was also a member of the Hungarian team that received a bronze medal in foil team in the 1924 Olympics.

Following his Olympic victory he worked as a dentist and sports journalist. He served briefly as the Deputy People's Comissar of Health for the Republic of Hungary.
