= Erik Sjøqvist =

Danish fencer (1900–1978)

Personal information
- Born: 16 October 1900 Frederiksberg, Denmark
- Died: 11 August 1978 (aged 77) Frederiksberg, Denmark

Sport
- Sport: Fencing

Erik Sjøqvist (16 October 1900 – 11 August 1978) was a Danish fencer. He competed in the individual and team foil competitions at the 1924 Summer Olympics.
