= Svend Munck =

Danish fencer

Personal information
- Full name: Svend Aage Munck
- Born: 16 April 1899 Copenhagen, Denmark
- Died: 1 May 1974 (aged 75) Rønne, Denmark

Sport
- Sport: Fencing

Svend Munck (16 April 1899 – 1 May 1974) was a Danish fencer. He competed in the sabre and foil events at the 1924 Summer Olympics.
