= Adrianus de Jong =

Dutch fencer (1882–1966)

Medal record

Men's fencing

Representing Netherlands

Olympic Games
Bronze medal – third place	1912 Stockholm	Sabre Team

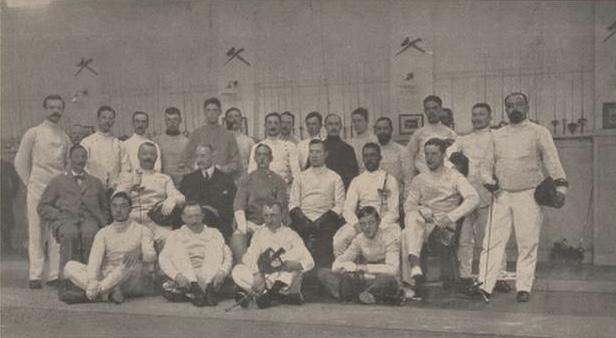
De Jong in 1912

Adrianus Egbert Willem "Adriaan" "Arie" de Jong (21 June 1882 – 23 December 1966) was a fencer who competed at five Olympic Games.

However, he had his greatest international success with the sabre, where he won the first two World Championships in 1922 and 1923.

With the épée, he won bronze at the 1912 Olympics and silver at the 1922 world championships.

During the individual sabre event at the 1924 Olympics, he reached the semi-finals against Hungarian Sándor Pósta and was leading by three hits when an audience member fell through his chair. This distracted the jury, who failed to see De Jong's decisive hit. Disrupted, De Jong lost the bout. De Jong eventually finished fifth (one ahead of eventual seven-time Danish Olympian Ivan Joseph Martin Osiier) while Pósta went on to win gold.

== See also ==
- List of athletes with the most appearances at Olympic Games

Olympic Games
Preceded by J. H. van Dijk	Flagbearer for Netherlands; Paris 1924	Succeeded by Sam Olij
