= Charles Crahay =

Belgian fencer

Personal information
- Born: 9 November 1889 Antwerp, Belgium
- Died: 28 February 1936 (aged 46) Antwerp, Belgium

Sport
- Sport: Fencing
Medal record
Men's fencing
Representing Belgium
Olympic Games
Silver medal – second place	1924 Paris	Foil, team

Charles Jean Albert Marie Edmond Crahay (9 November 1889 - 28 February 1936) was a Belgian fencer. He won a silver medal in the team foil competition at the 1924 Summer Olympics.
