= János Garay (fencer) =

Hungarian fencer (1889–1945)

Jànos Garay

Personal information
- Nationality: Hungarian
- Born: 23 February 1889 Budapest, Austria-Hungary
- Died: 21 April 1945 (aged 56) Mauthausen-Gusen concentration camp, Nazi Germany

Sport
- Sport: Fencing, sabre
- Club: Nemzeti Vívó Club; Tisza István Vívóklub

Achievements and titles
- Olympic finals: 1924, 1928
Medal record
Men's fencing

János Garay (23 February 1889 – 21 April 1945) was a Jewish Hungarian fencer, and one of the best sabre fencers in the world in the 1920s. Gaining international recognition in Olympic sabre competition, he distinguished himself winning a gold medal in 1928 in Amsterdam, and a silver and bronze medal in 1924 in Paris.

== Personal ==
Garay had two children: Jànos, a water polo player and Mària, a swimmer. He was also father-in-law to Valéria Gyenge.

== Fencing career ==
=== Hungarian Championship ===
Garay was the Hungarian national sabre champion in 1923.

=== European and World Championships ===
In 1925 and 1930, Garay captured the Individual European Sabre Championship gold medal. He won the team sabre gold medal at the 1930 European Championships. The European Championships were predecessor to the World Championships, first held in 1937.

== Olympics ==
Garay served as an Olympic referee and judge for the fencing competition in the 1936 Olympics in Berlin.

=== 1928 ===
He won a gold medal in team saber at the 1928 Amsterdam Games.

=== 1924 ===
He won a silver medal in team saber and a bronze medal in individual sabre at the 1924 Paris Olympics.

== Concentration Camp and Death ==
He was one of 437,000 Jews deported from Hungary to a concentration camp after Germany occupied the country in 1944.

At Mauthausen concentration camp, where he had been taken, he was a prominent detainee and a Nazi hostage in their negotiations with the Soviets. He was kept in a very small bunker and died in May 1945 as “death case # 14271,” his death officially declared as due to cardiac insufficiency.

== Hall of Fame ==
Garay, who was Jewish, was inducted in 1990 into The International Jewish Sports Hall of Fame, Wingate Institute, Netanya, Israel.

== See also ==
- List of select Jewish fencers
- List of Jewish Olympic medalists
