= František Dvořák (fencer) =

Czech fencer

Personal information
- Born: 21 January 1871 Trhové Sviny, Austria-Hungary
- Died: 30 December 1939 (aged 68) České Budějovice, Protectorate of Bohemia and Moravia

Sport
- Sport: Fencing

František Dvořák (21 January 1871 – 30 December 1939) was a Czech fencer. He competed at the 1920 and 1924 Summer Olympics.
