= Fencing at the 1924 Summer Olympics – Men's épée =

Olympic fencing event

Men's épée at the Games of the VIII Olympiad
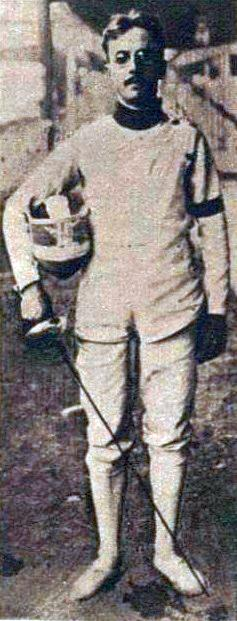
- Gold medalist Charles Delporte
- Venue: Vélodrome d'hiver
- Dates: July 10–11, 1924
- Competitors: 67 from 18 nations

Medalists
1st place, gold medalist(s)		Charles Delporte; Belgium
2nd place, silver medalist(s)		Roger Ducret; France
3rd place, bronze medalist(s)		Nils Hellsten; Sweden

The men's épée was one of seven fencing events on the Fencing at the 1924 Summer Olympics programme. It was the sixth appearance of the event, which had not been on the programme in 1896. The competition was held from Wednesday, July 10, 1924 to Thursday, July 11, 1924. 67 fencers from 18 nations competed. Nations were limited to four competitors each. The event was won by Charles Delporte of Belgium, the nation's second victory in the individual épée (matching France and Cuba for most among nations). Silver went to Roger Ducret of France. Nils Hellsten earned Sweden's first medal in the event with his bronze.

== Background ==
This was the sixth appearance of the event, which was not held at the first Games in 1896 (with only foil and sabre events held) but has been held at every Summer Olympics since 1900.

Four of the 12 finalists from the 1920 Games returned: gold medalist Armand Massard of France, fourth-place finisher Ernest Gevers of Belgium, ninth-place finisher Gustaf Lindblom of Sweden, and tenth-place finisher Charles Delporte of Belgium. Of the first three World Champions since that event started in 1921, two were present: 1922 champion Raoul Heide of Norway and 1923 (reigning) champion Wouter Brouwer of the Netherlands. (1921 winner Lucien Gaudin competed on the French team in the team event, but was not one of the four fencers in the individual event.)

Uruguay made its debut in the event. Belgium, Great Britain, and the United States each appeared for the fifth time, tied for most among nations.

== Competition format ==
The competition was held over four rounds. In each round, each pool held a round-robin, with bouts to 1 touch. Double-touches counted as touches against both fencers. The format returned to using barrages to separate fencers tied in the advancement spot (as had been done in 1908), rather than using head-to-head results of bouts already fenced were used (as in 1912 and 1920). The size of the pools remained at the relatively large levels introduced in 1920, with the final and semifinals consisting of 12 fencers each.

- First round: 7 pools of between 9 and 10 fencers each. The 6 fencers in each pool with the most wins advanced to the quarterfinals.
- Second round: 4 pools of 10 or 11 fencers each. The 6 fencers in each pool with the most wins advanced to the semifinals.
- Semifinals: 2 pools of 12 fencers each. The 6 fencers in each pool with the most wins advanced to the final.
- Final: 1 pool of 12 fencers.

== Schedule ==
Date	Time	Round
Thursday, 10 July 1924		Round 1 Quarterfinals
Friday, 11 July 1924		Semifinals; Final

== Results ==
=== Round 1 ===
The top six fencers, by number of wins, in each pool advanced. Double-losses were allowed. Tie-breakers were held within a group tied on a number of wins that broke between qualification and non-qualification.

==== Pool A ====
Rank	Fencer	Nation	Wins	Losses	Notes
1	Ernest Gevers	Belgium	6	3	Q
1	Gustaf Lindblom	Sweden	6	3	Q
3	George Calnan	United States	5	4	Q
3	Joseph Misrahi	Egypt	5	4	Q
3	Frederico Paredes	Portugal	5	4	Q
6	Pieter von Boven	Netherlands	4	5	B
6	Konstantinos Nikolopoulos	Greece	4	5	B
6	Viggo Stilling-Andersen	Denmark	4	5	B
9	Johan Falkenberg	Norway	3	6	
10	Carlos Miguel	Spain	1	8	

Barrage

Rank	Fencer	Nation	Wins	Losses	Notes
6	Pieter von Boven	Netherlands	2	0	Q
7	Konstantinos Nikolopoulos	Greece	1	1	
8	Viggo Stilling-Andersen	Denmark	0	2	

==== Pool B ====
Rank	Fencer	Nation	Wins	Losses	Notes
1	Nils Hellsten	Sweden	8	1	Q
2	Renzo Compagna	Italy	7	2	Q
3	Wouter Brouwer	Netherlands	5	4	B
3	Mário de Lopez	Portugal	5	4	B
3	Léon Tom	Belgium	5	4	B
3	Tryfon Triantafyllakos	Greece	5	4	B
3	Héctor Belo	Uruguay	5	4	B
8	Félix de Pomés	Spain	3	6	
9	Frithjof Lorentzen	Norway	1	8	
10	Ahmed Hassanein	Egypt	0	9	

Barrage

Rank	Fencer	Nation	Wins	Losses	Notes
3	Wouter Brouwer	Netherlands	2	2	Q
3	Mário de Lopez	Portugal	2	1	Q
3	Léon Tom	Belgium	2	1	Q
3	Tryfon Triantafyllakos	Greece	2	1	Q
7	Héctor Belo	Uruguay	0	3	

==== Pool C ====
Rank	Fencer	Nation	Wins	Losses	Notes
1	Charles Delporte	Belgium	7	2	Q
2	Charles Biscoe	Great Britain	6	3	Q
2	Virgilio Mantegazza	Italy	6	3	Q
4	George Breed	United States	5	4	Q
4	Carl Gripenstedt	Sweden	5	4	Q
6	Krikor Agathon	Egypt	4	5	B
6	Domingo Mendy	Uruguay	4	5	B
8	Constantin Antoniades	Switzerland	3	6	
9	Josef Jungmann	Czechoslovakia	2	7	
9	Miguel Zabalza	Spain	2	7	

Barrage

Rank	Fencer	Nation	Wins	Losses	Notes
6	Krikor Agathon	Egypt	1	0	Q
7	Domingo Mendy	Uruguay	0	1	

==== Pool D ====
Rank	Fencer	Nation	Wins	Losses	Notes
1	Roger Ducret	France	6	2	Q
1	Robert Frater	Great Britain	6	2	Q
1	Pedro Nazar	Argentina	6	2	Q
4	Frédéric Fitting	Switzerland	5	3	Q
5	Paul Anspach	Belgium	4	4	Q
5	Conrado Rolando	Uruguay	4	4	Q
7	Eduardo Alonso	Cuba	2	6	
7	Theodoros Foustanos	Greece	2	6	
9	Josef Javůrek	Czechoslovakia	0	8	

==== Pool E ====
Rank	Fencer	Nation	Wins	Losses	Notes
1	Eugène Empeyta	Switzerland	6	2	Q
2	Armand Massard	France	5	3	Q
2	Allen Milner	United States	5	3	Q
2	Ivan Osiier	Denmark	5	3	Q
5	Martin Holt	Great Britain	4	4	B
5	Luis Lucchetti	Argentina	4	4	B
5	Ramíro Mañalich	Cuba	4	4	B
8	Salvador Quesada	Cuba	1	7	
9	Santos Ferreira	Uruguay	0	8	

Barrage

Rank	Fencer	Nation	Wins	Losses	Notes
5	Martin Holt	Great Britain	1	0	Q
5	Luis Lucchetti	Argentina	1	0	Q
7	Ramíro Mañalich	Cuba	0	2	

==== Pool F ====
Rank	Fencer	Nation	Wins	Losses	Notes
1	Gaston Cornereau	France	7	1	Q
2	Sigurd Akre	Norway	4	4	Q
2	Ruimondo Ferro	Portugal	4	4	Q
2	Willem Hubert	Netherlands	4	4	Q
2	Wenceslao Paunero	Argentina	4	4	Q
2	Peter Ryefelt	Denmark	4	4	Q
7	Arthur Lyon	United States	3	5	
8	Robert Montgomerie	Great Britain	2	6	
8	Jan Tille	Czechoslovakia	2	6	

==== Pool G ====
Rank	Fencer	Nation	Wins	Losses	Notes
1	Domingo García	Spain	8	1	Q
2	Ramón Fonst	Cuba	7	2	Q
3	Georges Buchard	France	5	4	Q
3	Raoul Heide	Norway	5	4	Q
3	Henri Jacquet	Switzerland	5	4	Q
6	Bror Lagercrantz	Sweden	4	5	B
6	Jan de Beaufort	Netherlands	4	5	B
8	Jens Berthelsen	Denmark	2	7	
8	Francisco Bollini	Argentina	2	7	
8	António de Castro	Portugal	2	7	

Barrage

Rank	Fencer	Nation	Wins	Losses	Notes
6	Bror Lagercrantz	Sweden	1	0	Q
7	Jan de Beaufort	Netherlands	0	1	

=== Quarterfinals ===
The top six fencers, by number of wins, in each pool advanced. Double-losses were allowed. Tie-breakers were held within a group tied on a number of wins that broke between qualification and non-qualification.

==== Quarterfinal A ====
Rank	Fencer	Nation	Wins	Losses	Notes
1	Charles Delporte	Belgium	7	3	Q
1	Domingo García	Spain	7	3	Q
1	Raoul Heide	Norway	7	3	Q
1	Luis Lucchetti	Argentina	7	3	Q
5	Ivan Osiier	Denmark	6	4	Q
6	Roger Ducret	France	5	5	Q
7	Gustaf Lindblom	Sweden	4	6	
8	Krikor Agathon	Egypt	3	7	
8	George Calnan	United States	3	7	
8	Frederico Paredes	Portugal	3	7	
11	Martin Holt	Great Britain	2	8	

==== Quarterfinal B ====
Rank	Fencer	Nation	Wins	Losses	Notes
1	Ramón Fonst	Cuba	7	2	Q
1	Carl Gripenstedt	Sweden	7	2	Q
3	Henri Jacquet	Switzerland	6	3	Q
3	Léon Tom	Belgium	6	3	Q
5	Gaston Cornereau	France	5	4	Q
6	Peter Ryefelt	Denmark	4	5	Q
7	Ruimondo Ferro	Portugal	3	6	
8	Wouter Brouwer	Netherlands	2	7	
8	Pedro Nazar	Argentina	2	7	
10	George Breed	United States	1	8	

==== Quarterfinal C ====
Rank	Fencer	Nation	Wins	Losses	Notes
1	Frédéric Fitting	Switzerland	9	1	Q
2	Renzo Compagna	Italy	7	3	Q
3	Paul Anspach	Belgium	6	4	Q
3	Mário de Lopez	Portugal	6	4	Q
5	Allen Milner	United States	5	5	Q
6	Armand Massard	France	4	6	B
6	Willem Hubert	Netherlands	4	6	B
6	Conrado Rolando	Uruguay	4	6	B
9	Tryfon Triantafyllakos	Greece	3	7	
10	Robert Frater	Great Britain	2	8	
10	Bror Lagercrantz	Sweden	2	8	

Barrage

Rank	Fencer	Nation	Wins	Losses	Notes
6	Armand Massard	France	2	0	Q
7	Willem Hubert	Netherlands	1	1	
8	Conrado Rolando	Uruguay	0	2	

==== Quarterfinal D ====
Rank	Fencer	Nation	Wins	Losses	Notes
1	Georges Buchard	France	6	3	Q
1	Eugène Empeyta	Switzerland	6	3	Q
1	Ernest Gevers	Belgium	6	3	Q
1	Nils Hellsten	Sweden	6	3	Q
1	Virgilio Mantegazza	Italy	6	3	Q
6	Charles Biscoe	Great Britain	4	5	B
6	Joseph Misrahi	Egypt	4	5	B
6	Sigurd Akre	Norway	4	5	B
9	Pieter von Boven	Netherlands	1	8	
10	Wenceslao Paunero	Argentina	0	9	

Barrage

Rank	Fencer	Nation	Wins	Losses	Notes
6	Charles Biscoe	Great Britain	2	0	Q
7	Joseph Misrahi	Egypt	1	1	
8	Sigurd Akre	Norway	0	2	

=== Semifinals ===
The top six fencers, by number of wins, in each pool advanced. Double-losses were allowed. Tie-breakers were held within a group tied on a number of wins that broke between qualification and non-qualification.

==== Semifinal A ====
Rank	Fencer	Nation	Wins	Losses	Notes
1	Léon Tom	Belgium	7	4	Q
2	Renzo Compagna	Italy	6	5	Q
2	Gaston Cornereau	France	6	5	Q
2	Charles Delporte	Belgium	6	5	Q
2	Roger Ducret	France	6	5	Q
2	Nils Hellsten	Sweden	6	5	Q
7	Mário de Lopez	Portugal	5	6	
7	Raoul Heide	Norway	5	6	
7	Luis Lucchetti	Argentina	5	6	
10	Henri Jacquet	Switzerland	4	7	
10	Ivan Osiier	Denmark	4	7	
12	Frédéric Fitting	Switzerland	3	8	

==== Semifinal B ====
Rank	Fencer	Nation	Wins	Losses	Notes
1	Virgilio Mantegazza	Italy	9	2	Q
2	Georges Buchard	France	7	4	Q
2	Armand Massard	France	7	4	Q
4	Paul Anspach	Belgium	6	5	Q
5	Peter Ryefelt	Denmark	5	6	Q
6	Ernest Gevers	Belgium	4	7	B
6	Charles Biscoe	Great Britain	4	7	B
6	Eugène Empeyta	Switzerland	4	7	B
6	Ramón Fonst	Cuba	4	7	B
6	Domingo García	Spain	4	7	B
6	Carl Gripenstedt	Sweden	4	7	B
6	Allen Milner	United States	4	7	B

Barrage

Rank	Fencer	Nation	Wins	Losses	Notes
6	Ernest Gevers	Belgium	5	1	Q
7	Charles Biscoe	Great Britain	3	3	
7	Eugène Empeyta	Switzerland	3	3	
7	Ramón Fonst	Cuba	3	3	
7	Domingo García	Spain	3	3	
7	Carl Gripenstedt	Sweden	3	3	
12	Allen Milner	United States	1	5	

=== Final ===
Double-losses were allowed. Tie-breakers were held within a group as necessary for individual placing to sixth place; this required two rounds of tie-breakers (the first round for 2nd-5th; the second round for 2nd/3rd and 4th/5th).

Rank	Fencer	Nation	Wins	Losses	Notes
1st place, gold medalist(s)	Charles Delporte	Belgium	8	3	
2	Roger Ducret	France	7	4	B
2	Nils Hellsten	Sweden	7	4	B
2	Gaston Cornereau	France	7	4	B
2	Armand Massard	France	7	4	B
6	Virgilio Mantegazza	Italy	6	5	
7	Georges Buchard	France	5	6	
7	Léon Tom	Belgium	5	6	
9	Paul Anspach	Belgium	4	7	
9	Peter Ryefelt	Denmark	4	7	
11	Renzo Compagna	Italy	2	9	
12	Ernest Gevers	Belgium	1	10	

First barrage

Rank	Fencer	Nation	Wins	Losses	Notes
2	Roger Ducret	France	2	1	BA
2	Nils Hellsten	Sweden	2	1	BA
4	Gaston Cornereau	France	1	2	BB
4	Armand Massard	France	1	2	BB

Second barrage A

Rank	Fencer	Nation	Wins	Losses
2nd place, silver medalist(s)	Roger Ducret	France	1	0
3rd place, bronze medalist(s)	Nils Hellsten	Sweden	0	1

Second barrage B

Rank	Fencer	Nation	Wins	Losses
4	Gaston Cornereau	France	1	0
5	Armand Massard	France	0	1

== Results summary ==
Rank	Fencer	Nation	Round 1			Quarterfinals			Semifinals			Final		Total	
Rank	Fencer	Nation	Wins	Losses	Rank	Wins	Losses	Rank	Wins	Losses	Rank	Wins	Losses	Wins	Losses
1st place, gold medalist(s)	Charles Delporte	Belgium	7	2	1st	7	3	1st	6	5	2nd	8	3	28	13
2nd place, silver medalist(s)	Roger Ducret	France	6	2	1st	5	5	6th	6	5	2nd	7+2+1	4+1+0	27	17
3rd place, bronze medalist(s)	Nils Hellsten	Sweden	8	1	1st	6	3	1st	6	5	2nd	7+2+0	4+1+1	29	15
4	Gaston Cornereau	France	7	1	1st	5	4	5th	6	5	2nd	7+1+1	4+2+0	27	16
5	Armand Massard	France	5	3	2nd	4+2	6+0	6th	7	4	2nd	7+1+0	4+2+1	26	20
6	Virgilio Mantegazza	Italy	6	3	2nd	6	3	1st	9	2	1st	6	5	27	13
7	Georges Buchard	France	5	4	3rd	6	3	1st	7	4	2nd	5	6	23	17
7	Léon Tom	Belgium	5+2	4+1	3rd	6	3	3rd	7	4	1st	5	6	25	18
9	Paul Anspach	Belgium	4	4	5th	6	4	3rd	6	5	4th	4	7	20	20
9	Peter Ryefelt	Denmark	4	4	2nd	4	5	6th	5	6	5th	4	7	17	22
11	Renzo Compagna	Italy	7	2	2nd	7	3	2nd	6	5	2nd	2	9	22	19
12	Ernest Gevers	Belgium	6	3	1st	6	3	1st	4+5	7+1	6th	1	10	22	24
13	Charles Biscoe	Great Britain	5	3	2nd	4+2	5+0	6th	4+3	7+3	7th	Did not advance		18	18
13	Eugène Empeyta	Switzerland	6	2	1st	6	3	1st	4+3	7+3	7th	Did not advance		19	15
13	Ramón Fonst	Cuba	7	2	2nd	7	2	1st	4+3	7+3	7th	Did not advance		21	14
13	Domingo García	Spain	8	1	1st	7	3	1st	4+3	7+3	7th	Did not advance		22	14
13	Carl Gripenstedt	Sweden	5	4	4th	7	2	1st	4+3	7+3	7th	Did not advance		19	16
13	Raoul Heide	Norway	5	4	3rd	7	3	1st	5	6	7th	Did not advance		17	13
13	Mário de Lopez	Portugal	5+2	4+1	3rd	6	4	3rd	5	6	7th	Did not advance		18	15
13	Luis Lucchetti	Argentina	4+1	4+0	5th	7	3	1st	5	6	7th	Did not advance		17	13
21	Henri Jacquet	Switzerland	5	4	3rd	6	3	3rd	4	7	10th	Did not advance		15	14
21	Ivan Osiier	Denmark	5	3	2nd	6	4	5th	4	7	10th	Did not advance		15	14
23	Frédéric Fitting	Switzerland	5	3	4th	9	1	1st	3	8	12th	Did not advance		17	12
23	Allen Milner	United States	5	3	2nd	5	5	5th	4+1	7+5	12th	Did not advance		15	20
25	Ruimondo Ferro	Portugal	4	4	2nd	3	6	7th	Did not advance					7	10
25	Willem Hubert	Netherlands	4	4	2nd	4+1	6+1	7th	Did not advance					9	11
25	Gustaf Lindblom	Sweden	6	3	1st	4	6	7th	Did not advance					10	9
25	Joseph Misrahi	Egypt	5	4	3rd	4+1	5+1	7th	Did not advance					10	10
29	Krikor Agathon	Egypt	4+1	5+0	6th	3	7	8th	Did not advance					8	12
29	Sigurd Akre	Norway	4	4	2nd	4+0	5+2	8th	Did not advance					8	11
29	Wouter Brouwer	Netherlands	5+2	4+2	3rd	2	7	8th	Did not advance					9	13
29	George Calnan	United States	5	4	3rd	3	7	8th	Did not advance					8	11
29	Pedro Nazar	Argentina	6	2	1st	2	7	8th	Did not advance					8	9
29	Frederico Paredes	Portugal	5	4	3rd	3	7	8th	Did not advance					8	11
29	Conrado Rolando	Uruguay	4	4	5th	4+0	6+2	8th	Did not advance					8	12
36	Pieter von Boven	Netherlands	4+2	5+0	6th	1	8	9th	Did not advance					7	13
36	Tryfon Triantafyllakos	Greece	5+2	4+1	3rd	3	7	9th	Did not advance					10	12
38	George Breed	United States	5	4	4th	1	8	10th	Did not advance					6	12
38	Robert Frater	Great Britain	6	2	1st	2	8	10th	Did not advance					8	10
38	Bror Lagercrantz	Sweden	4+1	5+0	6th	2	8	10th	Did not advance					7	13
38	Wenceslao Paunero	Argentina	4	4	2nd	0	9	10th	Did not advance					4	13
42	Martin Holt	Great Britain	4+1	4+0	5th	2	8	11th	Did not advance					7	12
43	Eduardo Alonso	Cuba	2	6	7th	Did not advance								2	6
43	Jan de Beaufort	Netherlands	4+0	5+1	7th	Did not advance								4	6
43	Héctor Belo	Uruguay	5+0	4+3	7th	Did not advance								5	7
43	Theodoros Foustanos	Greece	2	6	7th	Did not advance								2	6
43	Arthur Lyon	United States	3	5	7th	Did not advance								3	5
43	Ramíro Mañalich	Cuba	4+0	4+2	7th	Did not advance								4	6
43	Domingo Mendy	Uruguay	4+0	5+1	7th	Did not advance								4	6
43	Konstantinos Nikolopoulos	Greece	4+1	5+1	7th	Did not advance								5	6
51	Constantin Antoniades	Switzerland	3	6	8th	Did not advance								3	6
51	Jens Berthelsen	Denmark	2	7	8th	Did not advance								2	7
51	Francisco Bollini	Argentina	2	7	8th	Did not advance								2	7
51	António de Castro	Portugal	2	7	8th	Did not advance								2	7
51	Robert Montgomerie	Great Britain	2	6	8th	Did not advance								2	6
51	Félix de Pomés	Spain	3	6	8th	Did not advance								3	6
51	Salvador Quesada	Cuba	1	7	8th	Did not advance								1	7
51	Viggo Stilling-Andersen	Denmark	4+0	5+2	8th	Did not advance								4	7
51	Jan Tille	Czechoslovakia	2	6	8th	Did not advance								2	6
60	Johan Falkenberg	Norway	3	6	9th	Did not advance								3	6
60	Santos Ferreira	Uruguay	0	8	9th	Did not advance								0	8
60	Josef Javůrek	Czechoslovakia	0	8	9th	Did not advance								0	8
60	Josef Jungmann	Czechoslovakia	2	7	9th	Did not advance								2	7
60	Frithjof Lorentzen	Norway	1	8	9th	Did not advance								1	8
60	Miguel Zabalza	Spain	2	7	9th	Did not advance								2	7
66	Ahmed Hassanein	Egypt	0	9	10th	Did not advance								0	9
66	Carlos Miguel	Spain	1	8	10th	Did not advance								1	8
