= Fencing at the 1924 Summer Olympics – Men's team épée =

Men's team épée at the Games of the VIII Olympiad
- Venue: Vélodrome d'hiver
- Dates: July 6–9, 1924
- Competitors: 88 from 16 nations

Medalists
1st place, gold medalist(s)		Georges Buchard; Roger Ducret; Lucien Gaudin; André Labattut; Lionel Liottel; Alexandre Lippmann; Georges Tainturier; France
2nd place, silver medalist(s)		Paul Anspach; Joseph De Craecker; Charles Delporte; Fernand de Montigny; Ernest Gevers; Léon Tom; Belgium
3rd place, bronze medalist(s)		Giulio Basletta; Marcello Bertinetti; Giovanni Canova; Vincenzo Cuccia; V. Montegazza; Oreste Moricca; Italy

The men's team épée was one of seven fencing events on the Fencing at the 1924 Summer Olympics programme. It was the fourth appearance of the event.

The competition was held from Saturday July 6, 1924, to Tuesday July 9, 1924. 16 teams, composed of 88 fencers, competed.

== Rosters ==
Each team could have up to eight members. Four were selected for each match.

Argentina
- Luis Lucchetti
- Pedro Nazar
- Wenceslao Paunero
- Cipriano Pons

Belgium
- Paul Anspach
- Joseph De Craecker
- Fernand de Montigny
- Charles Delporte
- Ernest Gevers
- Léon Tom

Cuba
- Eduardo Alonso
- Ramón Fonst
- Afonso López
- Ramíro Mañalich
- Osvaldo Miranda
- Salvador Quesada

Denmark
- Jens Berthelsen
- Ivan Osiier
- Peter Ryefelt
- Viggo Stilling-Andersen

France
- Georges Buchard
- Roger Ducret
- Lucien Gaudin
- André Labatut
- Alexandre Lippmann
- Georgers Tainturier

Great Britain
- Charles Biscoe
- Archibald Craig
- Robert Frater
- Martin Holt
- Robert Montgomerie
- Charles Notley

Greece
- Konstantinos Kotzias
- Konstantinos Nikolopoulos
- Tryfon Triantafyllakos

Italy
- Giulio Basletta
- Marcello Bertinetti
- Giovanni Canova
- Vincenzo Cuccia
- Virgilio Mantegazza
- Oreste Moricca

Netherlands
- Wouter Brouwer
- Jan de Beaufort
- Adrianus de Jong
- Willem Hubert
- Pieter van Boven
- Henri Wijnoldy-Daniëls

Norway
- Sigurd Akre
- Johan Falkenberg
- Raoul Heide
- Frithjof Lorentzen

Portugal
- Henrique da Silveira
- António de Castro
- Mário de Lopez
- Paulo d'Eça
- Ruimondo Ferro
- Jorge Paiva
- Frederico Paredes
- António Leite

Spain
- Félix de Pomés
- Juan Delgado
- Diego Díez
- Domingo García
- Jesús López de Lara
- Miguel Zabalza

Sweden
- Gustaf Dyrssen
- Carl Gripenstedt
- Nils Hellsten
- Gustaf Lindblom
- Bertil Uggla

Switzerland
- John Albaret
- Constantin Antoniades
- Eugène Empeyta
- Frédéric Fitting
- Henri Jacquet

United States
- George Breed
- George Calnan
- Arthur Lyon
- Allen Milner
- William Russell
- Leon Shore
- Donald Waldhaus

Uruguay
- Héctor Belo Herrera
- Santos Ferreira
- Domingo Mendy
- Conrado Rolando

== Results ==
=== Round 1 ===
The top two teams in each pool advanced. Each team played each other team in its pool, unless a match was unnecessary to determine qualification. Each team match included 16 bouts: four fencers from one team faced four fencers from the other team once apiece. Bouts were to two touches.

==== Pool A ====
The Spain vs. Norway match was tied on bouts, 8 to 8, and touches, 19 to 19, so was scored as a draw.

Pos	Team	W	L	BW	BL	Qual.	ESP	ITA	NOR
1	Spain	1.5	0.5	17	15	Q		9–7	8–8
2	Italy	1	1	16	16	Q	7–9		9–7
3	Norway	0.5	1.5	15	17		8–8	7–9	

Legend: Blue = home team win; Yellow = draw; Red = away team win.

==== Pool B ====
Pos	Team	W	L	BW	BL	Qual.	BEL	GBR	ARG
1	Belgium	1	0	11	5	Q			11–5
2	Great Britain	1	0	9	7	Q			9–7
3	Argentina	0	2	12	20		5–11	7–9	

Legend: Blue = home team win; Yellow = draw; Red = away team win.

==== Pool C ====
Pos	Team	W	L	BW	BL	Qual.	FRA	USA	SWE
1	France	1	0	13	3	Q			13–3
2	United States	1	0	9	7	Q			9–7
3	Sweden	0	2	10	22		3–13	7–9	

Legend: Blue = home team win; Yellow = draw; Red = away team win.

==== Pool D ====
Portugal received the top rank over the Netherlands on touches received, 56 to 60. Uruguay topped Denmark, 64 to 65.

Pos	Team	W	L	BW	BL	Qual.	POR	NED	URU	DEN
1	Portugal	2	1	26	22	Q		6–10	10–6	10–6
2	Netherlands	2	1	26	22	Q	10–6		9–7	7–9
3	Uruguay	1	2	22	26		6–10	7–9		9–7
4	Denmark	1	2	22	26		6–10	9–7	7–9	

Legend: Blue = home team win; Yellow = draw; Red = away team win.

==== Pool E ====
Pos	Team	W	L	BW	BL	Qual.	SUI	CUB	GRE
1	Switzerland	1	0	12	4	Q			12–4
2	Cuba	1	0	9	7	Q			9–7
3	Greece	0	2	11	21		4–12	7–9	

Legend: Blue = home team win; Yellow = draw; Red = away team win.

=== Quarterfinals ===
The top two teams in each pool advanced. Each team played each other team in its pool, unless a match was unnecessary to determine qualification. Each team match included 16 bouts: four fencers from one team faced four fencers from the other team once apiece. Bouts were to two touches.

==== Pool A ====
Pos	Team	W	L	BW	BL	Qual.	POR	ESP	CUB	GBR
1	Portugal	2	0	23	9	Q			11–5	12–4
2	Spain	2	0	20	12	Q			9–7	11–5
3	Cuba	0	2	12	20		5–11	7–9		
4	Great Britain	0	2	9	23		4–12	5–11		

Legend: Blue = home team win; Yellow = draw; Red = away team win.

==== Pool B ====
The United States won the match against Switzerland on touches, 21 to 19.

Pos	Team	W	L	BW	BL	Qual.	BEL	USA	SUI
1	Belgium	1	0	13	3	Q			13–3
2	United States	1	0	8	8	Q			8–8
3	Switzerland	0	2	11	21		3–13	8–8	

Legend: Blue = home team win; Yellow = draw; Red = away team win.

==== Pool C ====
Pos	Team	W	L	BW	BL	Qual.	FRA	ITA	NED
1	France	1	0	13	3	Q			13–3
2	Italy	1	0	10	6	Q			10–6
3	Netherlands	0	2	9	23		3–13	6–10	

Legend: Blue = home team win; Yellow = draw; Red = away team win.

=== Semifinals ===
The top two teams in each pool advanced. Each team played each other team in its pool, unless the match was unnecessary to decide qualification. Each team match included 16 bouts: four fencers from one team faced four fencers from the other team once apiece. Bouts were to two touches.

==== Pool A ====
France was ahead of Portugal on touches received in the standings, 15 to 17.

Pos	Team	W	L	BW	BL	Qual.	FRA	POR	USA
1	France	1	0	10	6	Q			10–6
2	Portugal	1	0	10	6	Q			10–6
3	United States	0	2	12	20		6–10	6–10	

Legend: Blue = home team win; Yellow = draw; Red = away team win.

==== Pool B ====
Pos	Team	W	L	BW	BL	Qual.	ITA	BEL	ESP
1	Italy	1	0	10	6	Q			10–6
2	Belgium	1	0	9	7	Q			9–7
3	Spain	0	2	13	19		6–10	7–9	

Legend: Blue = home team win; Yellow = draw; Red = away team win.

=== Final ===
Each team played each other team. Each team match included 16 bouts: four fencers from one team faced four fencers from the other team once apiece. Bouts were to two touches. France won its bout against Italy on touches, 21 to 20.

Pos	Team	W	L	BW	BL	FRA	BEL	ITA	POR
1st place, gold medalist(s)	France	3	0	29	17		10–5	8–8	11–4
2nd place, silver medalist(s)	Belgium	2	1	25	22	5–10		11–5	9–7
3rd place, bronze medalist(s)	Italy	1	2	21	26	8–8	5–11		8–7
4	Portugal	0	3	18	28	4–11	7–9	7–8	

Legend: Blue = home team win; Yellow = draw; Red = away team win.
