= Fencing at the 1924 Summer Olympics – Men's sabre =

Fencing event at the 1924 Summer Olympics

Men's sabre at the Games of the VIII Olympiad
- Fencing pictogram
- Venue: Vélodrome d'hiver
- Dates: July 16–18, 1924
- Competitors: 47 from 15 nations

Medalists
1st place, gold medalist(s)		Sándor Pósta	Hungary
2nd place, silver medalist(s)		Roger Ducret	France
3rd place, bronze medalist(s)		János Garay	Hungary

The men's sabre was one of seven fencing events on the Fencing at the 1924 Summer Olympics programme. It was the seventh appearance of the event, the only fencing event to have been on the programme at every Games. The competition was held from Tuesday July 16, 1924 to Thursday July 18, 1924. 47 fencers from 15 nations competed. Nations were limited to four fencers each, down from eight in 1920. The event was won by Sándor Pósta of Hungary, beginning a nine-Games streak in which Hungarians won the gold medal in the men's sabre (and was the third of eleven straight Games in which Hungary competed that a Hungarian won, with Hungary excluded from the 1920 competition). Roger Ducret of France took silver, while another Hungarian, János Garay, earned bronze.

Italian Oreste Puliti was ejected from the competition: after the other Italian fencers in the final were accused of conspiring to lose to him in order to inflate his score, an enraged Puliti either assaulted the Hungarian judge who made the accusation, Gyorgy Kovacs, or threatened to do so. Four months later, the two duelled with real swords. The duel ended in a draw.

== Background ==
This was the seventh appearance of the event, which is the only fencing event to have been held at every Summer Olympics. Four of the twelve finalists from 1920 returned: bronze medalist Adrianus de Jong of the Netherlands, fourth-place finisher Oreste Puliti of Italy, fifth-place finisher Jan van der Wiel of the Netherlands, and eighth-place finisher Robin Dalglish of Great Britain. De Jong had won the first two world championships in 1922 and 1923. Ivan Osiier of Denmark, in his fourth Olympics of seven in which he would compete, entered the sabre for the first time. The Hungarian team, which had claimed five of the six possible medals in 1908 and 1912 before being uninvited to the 1920 Games after World War I, returned to competition. Hungary was favored with multiple excellent fencers, but de Jong and Puliti were also strong contenders.

Argentina, Chile, Norway, Turkey, and Uruguay each made their debut in the men's sabre. Italy and Denmark each made their fifth appearance in the event, tied for most of any nation.

== Competition format ==
The event used a three-round format. In each round, the fencers were divided into pools to play a round-robin within the pool. Bouts were to four touches. Standard sabre rules applied.

- Quarterfinals: There were 7 pools of between 6 and 8 fencers each. The top 4 fencers in each quarterfinal advanced to the semifinals.
- Semifinals: There were 3 pools of 9 or 10 fencers each. The top 4 fencers in each semifinal advanced to the final.
- Final: The final pool had 12 fencers.

== Schedule ==
Date	Time	Round
Wednesday, 16 July 1924		Quarterfinals; Semifinals
Friday, 18 July 1924		Final

== Results ==
=== Quarterfinals ===
The top four fencers in each pool advanced. Bouts were to four touches. Bout record was the primary determiner of rank; ties were broken first by the number of times touched, then by touches scored, and then by a tiebreaker pool if the fencers were still tied.

==== Quarterfinal A ====
Pos	Fencer	W	L	TF	TA	Qual.	HC	JM	CR	BB	CE	EG	SM
1	Horacio Casco (ARG)	4	2	19	17	Q		2–4	4–3	1–4	4–1	4–2	4–3
2	Jules Maés (BEL)	4	2	19	18	Q	4–2		3–4	4–3	0–4	4–2	4–3
3	Conrado Rolando (URU)	4	2	19	18	Q	3–4	4–3		0–4	4–3	4–2	4–2
4	Bino Bini (ITA)	3	3	19	14	Q	4–1	3–4	4–0		3–4	1–4	4–1
5	Cornelis Ekkart (NED)	3	3	19	15		1–4	4–0	3–4	4–3		3–4	4–0
6	Ernest Gignoux (USA)	3	3	18	17		2–4	2–4	2–4	4–1	4–3		4–1
7	Svend Munck (DEN)	0	6	10	24		3–4	3–4	2–4	1–4	0–4	1–4	

Source: Official Report, p. 284.

==== Quarterfinal B ====
Sola beat Kershaw 4–2 in the tiebreaker.

Pos	Fencer	W	L	TF	TA	Qual.	HB	SP	GC	RS	CK	CA	JB
1	Héctor Belo (URU)	4	2	21	14	Q		4–2	3–4	4–1	2–4	4–2	4–1
2	Sándor Pósta (HUN)	4	2	20	16	Q	2–4		4–2	4–2	4–1	2–4	4–3
3	Georges Conraux (FRA)	4	2	21	18	Q	4–3	2–4		3–4	4–3	4–3	4–1
4	Raúl Sola (ARG)	3	3	18	19	Q	1–4	2–4	4–3		4–2	3–4	4–2
5	Cecil Kershaw (GBR)	3	3	18	19		4–2	1–4	3–4	2–4		4–3	4–2
6	Charles Acke (BEL)	2	4	16	21		2–4	4–2	3–4	4–3	3–4		0–4
7	Jens Berthelsen (DEN)	1	5	13	20		1–4	3–4	1–4	2–4	2–4	4–0	

Source: Official Report, p. 285.

==== Quarterfinal C ====
Pos	Fencer	W	L	TF	TA	Qual.	RDu	IO	RDa	ZS	JvdW	CM	MT
1	Roger Ducret (FRA)	6	0	24	11	Q		4–1	4–2	4–2	4–3	4–1	4–2
2	Ivan Osiier (DEN)	4	2	17	14	Q	1–4		4–0	0–4	4–3	4–1	4–2
3	Robin Dalglish (GBR)	3	3	15	15	Q	2–4	0–4		4–0	1–4	4–3	4–0
4	Zoltán Schenker (HUN)	3	3	17	16	Q	2–4	4–0	0–4		4–3	3–4	4–1
5	Jan van der Wiel (NED)	3	3	21	17		3–4	3–4	4–1	3–4		4–3	4–1
6	Chauncey McPherson (USA)	2	4	16	20		1–4	1–4	3–4	4–3	3–4		4–1
7	Manuel Toledo (ESP)	0	6	7	24		2–4	2–4	0–4	1–4	1–4	1–4	

Source: Official Report, p. 285.

==== Quarterfinal D ====
Pos	Fencer	W	L	TF	TA	Qual.	OP	RF	ES	DM	AP	JG
1	Oreste Puliti (ITA)	5	0	20	5	Q		4–3	4–1	4–0	4–1	4–0
2	Robert Feyerick (BEL)	4	1	19	13	Q	3–4		4–2	4–1	4–3	4–3
3	Edgar Seligman (GBR)	3	2	15	12	Q	1–4	2–4		4–1	4–3	4–0
4	Domingo Mendy (URU)	2	3	10	15	Q	0–4	1–4	1–4		4–3	4–0
5	Arturo Ponce (ARG)	1	4	14	17		1–4	3–4	3–4	3–4		4–1
6	Julio González (ESP)	0	5	4	20		0–4	3–4	0–4	0–4	1–4	

Source: Official Report, p. 285.

==== Quarterfinal E ====
Pos	Fencer	W	L	TF	TA	Qual.	GS	OvT	MP	CM	AC	AL	FG	IG
1	Giulio Sarrocchi (ITA)	6	1	26	14	Q		2–4	4–1	4–3	4–3	4–1	4–1	4–1
2	Ödön von Tersztyánszky (HUN)	6	1	27	15	Q	4–2		3–4	4–1	4–2	4–2	4–3	4–1
3	Marc Perrodon (FRA)	6	1	25	17	Q	1–4	4–3		4–2	4–2	4–3	4–3	4–0
4	Carmelo Merlo (ARG)	4	3	22	17	Q	3–4	1–4	2–4		4–0	4–1	4–1	4–3
5	Archibald Corble (GBR)	3	4	19	20		3–4	2–4	2–4	0–4		4–1	4–2	4–1
6	Arthur Lyon (USA)	1	6	14	25		1–4	2–4	3–4	1–4	1–4		4–1	2–4
7	Fernando Guillén (ESP)	1	6	15	26		1–4	3–4	3–4	1–4	2–4	1–4		4–2
8	Ioannis Georgiadis (GRE)	1	6	12	26		1–4	1–4	0–4	3–4	1–4	4–2	2–4	

Source: Official Report, p. 285.

==== Quarterfinal F ====
Pos	Fencer	W	L	TF	TA	Qual.	AdJ	KK	JG	PM	SA	FB
1	Adrianus de Jong (NED)	4	1	19	10	Q		4–3	4–2	4–0	3–4	4–1
2	Konstantinos Kotzias (GRE)	3	2	18	11	Q	3–4		3–4	4–1	4–2	4–0
3	János Garai (HUN)	3	2	17	15	Q	2–4	4–3		3–4	4–2	4–2
4	Pedro Mendy (URU)	2	3	12	16	Q	0–4	1–4	4–3		3–4	4–1
5	Sigurd Akre (NOR)	2	3	13	18		4–3	2–4	2–4	4–3		1–4
6	Fuat Balkan (TUR)	1	4	8	17		1–4	0–4	2–4	1–4	4–1	

Source: Official Report, p. 285.

==== Quarterfinal G ====
Pos	Fencer	W	L	TF	TA	Qual.	OB	MB	LC	MvD	RF	JdO
1	Omer Berck (BEL)	4	1	19	10	Q		3–4	4–1	4–2	4–1	4–2
2	Marcello Bertinetti (ITA)	4	1	19	12	Q	4–3		3–4	4–1	4–3	4–1
3	Laurence Castner (USA)	3	2	16	16	Q	1–4	4–3		4–3	3–4	4–2
4	Maarten van Dulm (NED)	2	3	14	14	Q	2–4	1–4	3–4		4–1	4–1
5	Rafael Fernández (CHI)	2	3	13	16		1–4	3–4	4–3	1–4		4–1
6	Julián de Olivares (ESP)	0	5	7	20		2–4	1–4	2–4	1–4	1–4	

Source: Official Report, p. 286.

=== Semifinals ===
The top four fencers in each pool advanced. Bouts were to four touches. Bout record was the primary determiner of rank; ties were broken first by the number of times touched, then by touches scored, and then by a tiebreaker pool if the fencers were still tied.

==== Semifinal A ====
Pos	Fencer	W	L	TF	TA	Qual.	BB	IO	JG	GC	OvT	CM	JM	CR	PM	ES
1	Bino Bini (ITA)	7	1	31	15	Q		4–2	4–3	3–4	4–3	4–2	4–0	4–0	4–1	
2	Ivan Osiier (DEN)	7	1	30	18	Q	2–4		4–2	4–2	4–3	4–2	4–1	4–1	4–3	
3	János Garai (HUN)	6	2	29	21	Q	3–4	2–4		4–2	4–2	4–3	4–2	4–1	4–3	
4	Georges Conraux (FRA)	5	3	26	22	Q	4–3	2–4	2–4		4–1	4–2	2–4	4–2	4–2	
5	Ödön von Tersztyánszky (HUN)	4	4	25	22		3–4	3–4	2–4	1–4		4–2	4–0	4–2	4–2	
6	Carmelo Merlo (ARG)	3	5	23	25		2–4	2–4	3–4	2–4	2–4		4–1	4–2	4–2	
7	Jules Maés (BEL)	2	6	15	27		0–4	1–4	2–4	4–2	0–4	1–4		3–4	4–1	
8	Conrado Rolando (URU)	2	6	16	28		0–4	1–4	1–4	2–4	2–4	2–4	4–3		4–1	
9	Pedro Mendy (URU)	0	8	15	32		1–4	3–4	3–4	2–4	2–4	2–4	1–4	1–4		
–	Edgar Seligman (GBR)	DNF	DNF	–	–											

Source: Official Report, p. 286.

==== Semifinal B ====
Pos	Fencer	W	L	TF	TA	Qual.	RDu	MB	ZS	AdJ	RS	OB	RDa	DM	LC
1	Roger Ducret (FRA)	7	1	30	17	Q		2–4	4–2	4–2	4–1	4–2	4–2	4–1	4–3
2	Marcello Bertinetti (ITA)	6	2	29	17	Q	4–2		2–4	3–4	4–0	4–3	4–3	4–1	4–0
3	Zoltán Schenker (HUN)	6	2	27	20	Q	2–4	4–2		4–3	1–4	4–3	4–3	4–1	4–0
4	Adrianus de Jong (NED)	5	3	28	16	Q	2–3	4–3	3–4		4–0	3–4	4–0	4–0	4–2
5	Raúl Sola (ARG)	4	4	20	21		1–4	0–4	4–1	0–4		4–2	3–4	4–0	4–2
6	Omer Berck (BEL)	3	5	25	24		2–4	3–4	3–4	4–3	2–4		4–0	4–1	3–4
7	Robin Dalglish (GBR)	3	5	20	24		2–4	3–4	3–4	0–4	4–3	0–4		4–0	4–1
8	Domingo Mendy (URU)	1	7	8	29		1–4	1–4	1–4	0–4	0–4	1–4	0–4		4–1
9	Laurence Castner (USA)	1	7	13	31		3–4	0–4	0–4	2–4	2–4	4–3	1–4	1–4	

Source: Official Report, p. 286.

==== Semifinal C ====
Pos	Fencer	W	L	TF	TA	Qual.	OP	SP	HC	GS	HB	RF	MP	MvD	KK
1	Oreste Puliti (ITA)	7	1	30	15	Q		4–2	2–4	4–1	4–3	4–2	4–1	4–1	4–1
2	Sándor Pósta (HUN)	6	2	28	20	Q	2–4		4–3	2–4	4–2	4–0	4–2	4–2	4–3
3	Horacio Casco (ARG)	5	3	26	17	Q	4–2	3–4		1–4	2–4	4–0	4–2	4–1	4–0
4	Giulio Sarrocchi (ITA)	5	3	24	21	Q	1–4	4–2	4–1		4–3	0–4	4–2	3–4	4–1
5	Héctor Belo (URU)	4	4	27	22		3–4	2–4	4–2	3–4		4–1	4–3	4–0	3–4
6	Robert Feyerick (BEL)	4	4	19	24		2–4	0–4	0–4	4–0	1–4		4–3	4–2	4–3
7	Marc Perrodon (FRA)	2	6	21	27		1–4	2–4	2–4	2–4	3–4	3–4		4–3	4–0
8	Maarten van Dulm (NED)	2	6	17	27		1–4	2–4	1–4	4–3	0–4	2–4	3–4		4–0
9	Konstantinos Kotzias (GRE)	1	7	12	31		1–4	3–4	0–4	1–4	4–3	3–4	0–4	0–4	

Source: Official Report, p. 286.

=== Final ===
After Hungarian judge György Kovács ruled that the three Italian teammates of Oreste Puliti had thrown their matches to Puliti, Puliti became enraged, and in response he assaulted Kovács or threatened to do so, resulting in his ejection from the competition. The other Italians then immediately withdrew in protest, thus leaving only eight of the scheduled 12 finalists to compete.

There were three separate tie-breaker barrages used, involving seven of the eight fencers: a sixth/seventh place match, a fourth/fifth place match, and a three-way match to determine the medals.

Pos	Fencer	W	L	TF	TA	Qual.	SP	RD	JG	ZS	AdJ	IO	GC	HC	OP	MB	BB	GS
1	Sándor Pósta (HUN)	5	2	26	20	B 1–3		4–1	3–4	4–3	4–3	3–4	4–3	4–2				
1	Roger Ducret (FRA)	5	2	22	18	B 1–3	1–4		4–2	4–3	1–4	4–1	4–3	4–1				
1	János Garai (HUN)	5	2	23	20	B 1–3	4–3	2–4		4–2	4–2	1–4	4–3	4–2				
4	Zoltán Schenker (HUN)	4	3	24	21	B 4/5	3–4	3–4	2–4		4–3	4–0	4–3	4–3				
4	Adrianus de Jong (NED)	4	3	24	21	B 4/5	3–4	4–1	2–4	3–4		4–3	4–3	4–2				
6	Ivan Osiier (DEN)	2	5	15	24	B 6/7	4–3	1–4	4–1	0–4	3–4		0–4	3–4				
6	Georges Conraux (FRA)	2	5	23	22	B 6/7	3–4	3–4	3–4	3–4	3–4	4–0		4–2				
8	Horacio Casco (ARG)	1	6	16	27		2–4	1–4	2–4	3–4	2–4	4–3	2–4					
–	Oreste Puliti (ITA)	DQ	DQ	–	–													
–	Marcello Bertinetti (ITA)	DNS	DNS	–	–													
–	Bino Bini (ITA)	DNS	DNS	–	–													
–	Giulio Sarrocchi (ITA)	DNS	DNS	–	–													

Source: Official Report, p. 288.

Barrages

Pos	Fencer	W	L	TF	TA	SP	RD	JG	ZS	AdJ	IO	GC
1st place, gold medalist(s)	Sándor Pósta (HUN)	2	0	8	1		4–0	4–1				
2nd place, silver medalist(s)	Roger Ducret (FRA)	1	1	4	7	0–4		4–3				
3rd place, bronze medalist(s)	János Garai (HUN)	0	2	4	8	1–4	3–4					
4	Zoltán Schenker (HUN)	1	0	4	3					4–3		
5	Adrianus de Jong (NED)	0	1	3	4				3–4			
6	Ivan Osiier (DEN)	1	0	4	2							4–2
7	Georges Conraux (FRA)	0	1	2	4						2–4	

Source: Official Report, p. 288.
