= Cuba at the 1924 Summer Olympics =

- IOC code: CUB

in Paris
- Flag bearer: Ramón Fonst
- Medals: Gold 0 Silver 0 Bronze 0 Total 0

Summer Olympics appearances (overview)
- 1900; 1904; 1908–1920; 1924; 1928; 1932–1936; 1948; 1952; 1956; 1960; 1964; 1968; 1972; 1976; 1980; 1984–1988; 1992; 1996; 2000; 2004; 2008; 2012; 2016; 2020; 2024

Cuba was represented at the 1924 Summer Olympics in Paris, France. It was the first time in 20 years that Cuban athletes had competed at the Olympic Games.

In total, nine athletes – all men – represented Cuba in two different sports including fencing and sailing.

== Background ==
Cuban athletes returned to the Olympics after a 20-year hiatus. The nation had made its debut at the 1900 Summer Olympics – also held in Paris, France – and later contested the 1904 Summer Olympics in St. Louis, Missouri, United States. Fencer Ramón Fonst – who was also part of the delegation for the 1924 Summer Olympics – was Cuba's sole representative in 1900 and he won two medals, a gold and a silver. At the following games, nine athletes represented Cuba and they increased their medal tally by earning three gold medals. However, they were then absent from the 1908 Summer Olympics in London, England, United Kingdom, the 1912 Summer Olympics in Stockholm, Sweden and the 1920 Summer Olympics in Antwerp, Belgium (the 1916 Summer Olympics due to be held in Berlin, Germany having been cancelled due to World War I).

== Competitors ==
In total, nine athletes represented Cuba at the 1924 Summer Olympics in Paris, France across two different sports.

Sport	Men	Women	Total
Fencing	6	0	6
Sailing	3	0	3
Total	9	0	9

== Fencing ==
In total, six Cuban athletes participated in the fencing events – Eduardo Alonso, Ramón Fonst, Ramíro Mañalich and Salvador Quesada in the men's individual épée and the men's team épée and Afonso López and Osvaldo Miranda in the men's team épée.

Fencer	Event	Round 1		Round 2		Quarterfinals		Semifinals		Final	
Fencer	Event	Result	Rank	Result	Rank	Result	Rank	Result	Rank	Result	Rank
Eduardo Alonso	Épée	2–6	7	N/A		did not advance					
Ramón Fonst	Épée	7–2	2 Q	N/A		7–2	1 Q	4–7	7	did not advance	
Ramíro Mañalich	Épée	4–4	7	N/A		did not advance					
Salvador Quesada	Épée	1–7	8	N/A		did not advance					
Eduardo Alonso; Ramón Fonst; Afonso López; Ramíro Mañalich; Osvaldo Miranda; Salvador Quesada	Team épée	1–0	2 Q	N/A		0–2	3	did not advance			

== Sailing ==
In total, three Cuban athletes participated in the sailing events – Pedro Cisneros, Enrique Conill and Antonio Saavedra in the 6 metre class.

Sailor	Event	Qualifying				Final			
Sailor	Event	Race 1	Race 2	Race 3	Total	Race 1	Race 2	Total	Rank
Pedro Cisneros; Enrique Conill; Antonio Saavedra	6 metre class	9 (DNF)	8	8 (DNF)	25	did not advance			9
