= Norway at the 1928 Summer Olympics =

- IOC code: NOR
- NOC: Norwegian National Federation of Sports

in Amsterdam
- Competitors: 52 in 9 sports
- Flag bearer: Kittil Askilt
- Medals Ranked 19th: Gold 1 Silver 2 Bronze 1 Total 4

Summer Olympics appearances (overview)
- 1900; 1904; 1908; 1912; 1920; 1924; 1928; 1932; 1936; 1948; 1952; 1956; 1960; 1964; 1968; 1972; 1976; 1980; 1984; 1988; 1992; 1996; 2000; 2004; 2008; 2012; 2016; 2020; 2024

Other related appearances
- 1906 Intercalated Games

Norway competed at the 1928 Summer Olympics in Amsterdam, Netherlands. 52 competitors, all men, took part in 42 events in 9 sports.

== Medalists ==
Medal	Name	Sport	Event	Date
Gold	Olav V of Norway, Johan Anker, Erik Anker, Håkon Bryhn	Sailing	6 m class	August 9
Silver	Eugen Johansen, Arthur Qvist, Bjart Ording	Equestrian	Team eventing	August 11
Silver	Henrik Robert	Sailing	12 ft dinghy	August 9
Bronze	Olav Sunde	Athletics	Men's javelin throw	August 2

== Boxing ==
Men's Flyweight (– 50.8 kg)

- Olav Nielsen

- First Round — Bye
- Second Round — Lost to Baddie Lebanon (RSA), points

Men's Heavyweight (+ 79.4 kg)

- Sverre Sørsdal

- First Round — Bye
- Quarterfinals — Defeated Alexander Kaletchetz (USA), KO-1
- Semifinals — Lost to Nils Ramm (SWE), points
- Third Place Match — Lost to Michael Michaelsen (DEN), walk-over

== Cycling ==
Four cyclists, all men, represented Norway in 1928.

Individual road race

- Gustav Kristiansen
- Karl Hansen
- Ragnvald Martinsen
- Reidar Raaen

== Equestrian ==
Six equestrians, all men, and seven horses represented Norway in 1928.

Individual dressage

- Paul Michelet on Benue

Individual eventing

- Bjart Ording on And Over
- Arthur Qvist on Hidalgo
- Eugen Johansen on Baby

Team eventing

- Bjart Ording on And Over, Arthur Qvist on Hidalgo, Eugen Johansen on Baby

Individual jumping

- Knut Gysler on Sans Peur
- Anton Klaveness on Barrabas
- Bjart Ording on Fram I

Team jumping

- Knut Gysler on Sans Peur, Anton Klaveness on Barrabas, Bjart Ording on Fram I

== Fencing ==
Five fencers, all men, represented Norway in 1928.

Men's foil

- Johan Falkenberg
- Frithjof Lorentzen
- Jacob Bergsland

Men's team foil

- Jacob Bergsland, Johan Falkenberg, Frithjof Lorentzen, Sigurd Akre-Aas

Men's épée

- Raoul Heide
- Sigurd Akre-Aas
- Frithjof Lorentzen

Men's team épée

- Sigurd Akre-Aas, Raoul Heide, Frithjof Lorentzen, Jacob Bergsland

Men's sabre

- Sigurd Akre-Aas

== Sailing ==
Nine sailors, all men, represented Norway in 1928.

12' Dinghy

- Henrik Robert

6 Metre

- Johan Anker, Erik Anker, Håkon Bryhn, Crown Prince Olav

8 Metre

- Bernhard Lund, Magnus Konow, Jens Salvesen, Wilhelm Wilhelmsen, Halfdan Hansen (Reserve, did not actually compete)

== Swimming ==
Men

Athlete	Event	Heat		Semifinal		Final	
Athlete	Event	Time	Rank	Time	Rank	Time	Rank
Knut Olsen	100 m freestyle	1:05.0		Unknown		Did not advance	
