= Egypt at the 1924 Summer Olympics =

- IOC code: EGY
- NOC: Egyptian Olympic Committee

in Paris
- Competitors: 24 in 9 sports
- Medals: Gold 0 Silver 0 Bronze 0 Total 0

Summer Olympics appearances (overview)
- 1912; 1920; 1924; 1928; 1932; 1936; 1948; 1952; 1956; 1960–1964; 1968; 1972; 1976; 1980; 1984; 1988; 1992; 1996; 2000; 2004; 2008; 2012; 2016; 2020; 2024

Other related appearances
- 1906 Intercalated Games –––– United Arab Republic (1960, 1964)

Egypt competed at the 1924 Summer Olympics in Paris, France. 24 competitors, all men, took part in 12 events in 9 sports.

== Athletics ==
A single athlete represented Egypt in 1924. It was the nation's second appearance in the sport as well as the Games.

Ranks given are within the heat.

Athlete	Event	Heats		Quarterfinals		Semifinals		Final	
Athlete	Event	Result	Rank	Result	Rank	Result	Rank	Result	Rank
Mohamed El-Sayed	1500 m	N/A				Unknown	4	Did not advance	
Mohamed El-Sayed	5000 m	N/A				Unknown	10	Did not advance	

== Boxing ==
A single boxer, Michel Haddad, represented Egypt at the 1924 Games. It was the nation's debut in the sport. Haddad lost his only bout.

Boxer	Weight class	Round of 32	Round of 16	Quarterfinals	Semifinals	Final / Bronze match	
Boxer	Weight class	Opposition Score	Opposition Score	Opposition Score	Opposition Score	Opposition Score	Rank
Michel Haddad	Lightweight	Marfut (ITA); L	Did not advance				17

Opponent nation	Wins	Losses	Percent
Italy	0	1	.000
Total	0	1	.000

Round	Wins	Losses	Percent
Round of 32	0	1	.000
Round of 16	0	0	–
Quarterfinals	0	0	–
Semifinals	0	0	–
Final	0	0	–
Bronze match	0	0	–
Total	0	1	.000

== Cycling ==
Three cyclists represented Egypt in 1924. It was the nation's debut in the sport.

=== Road cycling ===
Ranks given are within the heat.

Cyclist	Event	Final	
Cyclist	Event	Result	Rank
Ahmed Salem Hassan	Time trial	Did not finish	
Mohamed Madkour	Time trial	7:35:38.4	46

=== Track cycling ===
Ranks given are within the heat.

Cyclist	Event	First round		First repechage		Quarterfinals		Second repechage		Semifinals		Final	
Cyclist	Event	Result	Rank	Result	Rank	Result	Rank	Result	Rank	Result	Rank	Result	Rank
Mohamed Ali Mahmoud	50 km	N/A										Unknown	8–36
Ahmed Salem Hassan	50 km	N/A										Unknown	8–36
Mohamed Madkour	50 km	N/A										Unknown	8–36

== Fencing ==
Three fencers, all men, represented Egypt in 1924. It was the nation's second appearance in the sport.

Men

Ranks given are within the pool.

Fencer	Event	Round 1		Round 2		Quarterfinals		Semifinals		Final	
Fencer	Event	Result	Rank	Result	Rank	Result	Rank	Result	Rank	Result	Rank
Krikor Agathon	Épée	4–5	6 Q	N/A		3–7	8	Did not advance			
Ahmed Hassanein	Épée	0–9	10	N/A		Did not advance					
Joseph Misrahi	Épée	5–4	3 Q	N/A		4–5	7	Did not advance			

== Football ==

Egypt competed in the Olympic football tournament for the second time in 1924. The Egyptian side was on the winning side of one of the two major second-round upsets, beating Hungary three to nil.

Round 1
Bye

Round 2

May 29, 1924

Egypt	3–0	Hungary
Yakan 4' 58'; Hegazi 40'	Report

Stade de Paris
Attendance: 8,000
Referee: Luis Collina (ESP)

Quarterfinals

June 1, 1924

Sweden	5–0	Egypt
Kaufeldt 5' 71'; Brommesson 31' 34'; Rydell 49'	Report

Stade Pershing
Attendance: 6,484
Referee: Henri Christophe (BEL)

Final rank
5th place

== Shooting ==
A single sport shooter represented Egypt in 1924. It was the nation's debut in the sport. Agathon placed ninth in his only event, the rapid fire pistol.

Shooter	Event	Final	
Shooter	Event	Score	Rank
Krikor Agathon	25 m rapid fire pistol	17	9

== Weightlifting ==
Athlete	Event	1H Snatch	1H Clean & Jerk	Press	Snatch	Clean & Jerk	Total	Rank
Ahmed Samy	Men's 75 kg	72.5	77.5	97.5	85	115	447.5	4

== Wrestling ==
=== Greco-Roman ===
Men's

Athlete	Event	First round	Second round	Third round	Fourth round	Fifth round	Sixth round	Seventh round	Eighth round	Rank
Athlete	Event	Opposition Result	Opposition Result	Opposition Result	Opposition Result	Opposition Result	Opposition Result	Opposition Result	Opposition Result	Rank
Ibrahim Moustafa	Light heavyweight	Testonni (ITA); W	Baumert (FRA); W	Bye	Misset (NED); W	Svensson (SWE); L	Westergren (SWE); L	Did not advance	—N/a	4
Ahmed Rahmy	Lightweight	Keresztes (HUN); L	Kratochvíl (TCH); L	Did not advance				—N/a		=20
