= Boven =

Boven can refer to a number of individuals with that last name. The word is also Dutch for "above," and appears in the names of several locations in the Netherlands.

== People ==
- Don Boven (1925–2011), American basketball player, coach, and university instructor
- Jan Boven (born 1972), Dutch road bicycle racer
- Ana Maria Boven (born 1975), Puerto Rican/American singer, songwriter and entrepreneur; wife of Scott Thomas Boven
- Scott Thomas Boven (born 1981), Dutch/American entrepreneur

Bovens

- Luc Bovens, Belgian professor of philosophy
- Theo Bovens (born 1959), Dutch politician

van Boven

- Pieter van Boven (1898–1952), Dutch fencer
- Theo van Boven (1934–2026), Dutch jurist and law professor

== Places ==
- Boven Bolivia, village in Bonaire
- Boven Coppename, resort in Suriname
- Boven Digoel Regency in Papua province, Indonesia
- Boven-Haastrecht, town in South Holland
- Boven-Hardinxveld, town in South Holland
- Boven-Leeuwen, town in Gelderland
- Boven Merwede, river in the Netherlands
- Boven Saramacca, resort in Suriname
- Boven Suriname, resort in Suriname
- Waterval Boven, town in Mpumalanga, South Africa
