= Madkour =

Madkour is a surname. Notable people with the surname include:

- Hussein Madkour (1919–2001), Egyptian Olympic footballer
- Mary Madkour (1927–2013), American politician
- Mohamed Madkour (fl. 1924), Egyptian Olympic cyclist
- Nazli Madkour (born 1949), Egyptian artist
- Rachid Madkour (born 1977), Moroccan footballer
