= 2014–15 Primera División de Nicaragua =

Primera División
- Season: 2014–15
- Champions: Apertura: Walter Ferretti; Clausura: Real Esteli
- Relegated: Fox Villa
- Champions League: Walter Ferretti
- Top goalscorer: Apertura: (Spain) TBD - 11 goals Clausura: (Nicaragua) TBD - 13 goals
- Biggest home win: Apertura: TBD 5-0 TBD; Clausura: TBD 5-0 TBD
- Biggest away win: Apertura: TBD 5-0 TBD; Clausura: TBD 5-0 TBD
- Highest scoring: Apertura: TBD 5-0 TBD; Clausura: TBD 5-0 TBD

The 2014–15 season in Primera División de Nicaragua will be divided into two tournaments (Apertura and Clausura) and will determine the 65th and 66th champions in the history of the league. It will also provide the sole berth for the 2015–16 CONCACAF Champions League. The Apertura tournament will be played in the second half of 2014, while the Clausura will be played in the first half of 2015.

== Teams ==
A total of 10 teams will contest the league, including 8 sides from the 2013–14 season and one sides directly promoted from the 2013–14 Segunda division. The final participant will be determined in a two-legged play-off, in which the 9th placed Primera division side FC San Marcos will play the team who finished second in Segunda division which was Fox Villa. Fox Villa won 2-0 over FC San Marcos gaining promotion.

- ART Jalapa
- Diriangén FC
- UCEM Juventus FC
- Managua F.C.
- Deportivo Ocotal
- Real Madriz
- Real Esteli F.C.
- Fox Villa (Winner of the relegation/promotion playoff)
- UNAN Managua (Winner of the Segunda Division)
- Walter Ferretti

=== Promotion and relegation ===
- At the end of the 2013–14, UNAN Managua and Fox Villa were promoted to Primera Division
- At the end of the 2013–14, Chinandega FC and FC San Marcos were relegated to Segunda Division.

=== Changes ===
- Juventus Managua changed their name and will now be known as UCEM Juventus FC []

== Team information ==
Last updated: 2014

=== Personnel and sponsoring (2014 Apertura) ===
Team	Manager	Captain	Kit manufacturer	Shirt sponsor
ART Jalapa	(Nicaragua) Leonidas Rodríguez	TBD	TBD	TBD
Diriangén	(Nicaragua) Florencio Leiva	TBD	TBD	TBD
Fox Villa	(Nicaragua) Mario Aburto	(Nicaragua)	TBD	CARUNA R.L., Alcaldía de Jinotepe and GRH Logistics
UCEM Juventus F.C.	(Nicaragua) Douglas Urbina	(Nicaragua) José Alfredo Ramírez	TBD	TBD
Managua F.C.	(Nicaragua) Emilio Aburto	TBD	TBD	TBD
Deportivo Ocotal	(Nicaragua) Randall Moreno	(Honduras) Marcos Rivera	TBD	TBD
Real Madriz	(Colombia) Armando Ricardo Hernandez	(Nicaragua) Enoc Salgado	TBD	TBD
Real Esteli F.C.	(Nicaragua) Ramón Otoniel Olivas	(Honduras) (Nicaragua) Elmer Mejia	TBD	TBD
UNAN Managua	(Nicaragua) Edward Urroz	(Honduras) (Nicaragua) Herberth Cabrera	TBD	UNAN Managua
Walter Ferretti	(Brazil) Flavio da Silva	(Nicaragua) Denis Espinoza	TBD	TBD

== Managerial changes ==
=== Before the season ===
Team	Outgoing manager	Manner of departure	Date of vacancy	Replaced by	Date of appointment
Deportivo Walter Ferretti	(Nicaragua) Florencio Levia	Resigned	2014	(Brazil) Flavio Da Silva	2014
Real Madriz	(Colombia) Luis Montana	Contract finished (moved to assistant coach of UNAN Managua	2014	(Colombia) Armando Ricardo Hernandez	2014
Diriangen FC	(Brazil) Flavio Da Silva	Contract finished	2014	(Nicaragua) Florencio Levia	2014

=== During the season ===
Team	Outgoing manager	Manner of departure	Date of vacancy	Replaced by	Date of appointment
Diriangen FC	(Nicaragua) Florencio Levia	Sacked	3 August 2014	(Argentina) Roberto Chanampe	2014
Deportivo Ocotal	(Nicaragua) Randall Moreno	Sacked	August 2014	(Nicaragua) Eduardo Alonso	August 2014
Real Madriz	(Colombia) Armando Ricardo Hernandez	Sacked	October 2014	(Honduras) Mario Cruz	October 15, 2014
UNAN Managua	(Nicaragua) Edward Urroz	Sacked	October 14, 2014	(Colombia) Luis Montaño	October 15, 2014

== Apertura ==
The 2014 Apertura was the first tournament of the season. It began on 2014.

=== Regular season ===
The regular season began on 2014. The top four finishers will move on to the next stage of the competition.

==== Standings ====
Pos	Team	Pld	W	D	L	GF	GA	GD	Pts	Qualification
1	Walter Ferretti	18	11	6	1	29	3	+26	39	Semi-finals Group
2	Real Esteli	18	10	6	2	27	9	+18	36	Semi-finals Group
3	Diriangén FC	18	10	3	5	17	11	+6	33	Semi-finals Group
4	Juventus Managua	18	9	4	5	24	18	+6	31	Semi-finals Group
5	Managua	18	7	5	6	24	17	+7	26	
6	Ocotal	18	7	4	7	22	21	+1	25	
7	ART Jalapa	18	6	5	7	18	24	−6	23	
8	Real Madriz	18	5	5	8	25	27	−2	20	
9	UNAN Managua	18	5	2	11	24	34	−10	17	
10	Fox Villa	18	0	0	18	10	56	−46	0	

Updated to match(es) played on December 2014. Source:
Rules for classification: 1) points; 2) goal difference; 3) number of goals scored.

==== Results ====
Home \ Away	JAL	DIR	FVI	JUV	MAN	OCO	RES	RMD	UNA	WFE
ART Jalapa		2–0	2–1	1–2	0–0	0–0	0–0	3–1	3–2	0–0
Diriangén FC	1–0		3–1	1–0	0–2	1–0	0–0	2–0	1–0	0–0
Fox Villa	0–2	1–4		0–1	0–2	0–2	1–2	1–4	2–6	0–1
Juventus Managua	1–0	0–1	5–2		0–1	1–0	1–0	1–1	3–2	0–3
Managua	1–2	0–1	5–0	1–3		4–0	0–0	3–2	0–1	0–0
Ocotal	2–1	1–0	5–1	2–2	1–0		0–1	0–2	3–0	1–1
Real Esteli	4–1	0–0	3–0	1–1	4–1	3–1		1–0	3–1	2–0
Real Madriz	0–0	3–1	4–0	1–3	2–2	1–1	0–2		1–2	0–0
UNAN Managua	3–1	0–1	1–0	0–0	1–2	2–3	1–1	2–3		0–5
Walter Ferretti	6–0	1–0	4–0	1–0	0–0	1–0	1–0	3–0	2–0	

Updated to match(es) played on unknown. Source:
Legend: Blue = home team win; Yellow = draw; Red = away team win.

==== Positions by round ====
Team ╲ Round	1	2	3	4	5	6	7	8	9	10	11	12	13	14	15	16	17	18
Real Esteli	4	1	2	2	3	1	2	6	5	4	4	3	3	2	2	2	2	2
Managua	5	3	3	3	4	5	5	4	3	3	3	4	4	5	5	5	5	5
Walter Ferretti	2	2	1	1	1	2	3	1	1	1	2	1	1	1	1	1	1	1
UNAN Managua	6	8	7	7	6	8	8	9	9	9	8	8	8	8	9	9	9	9
Diriangén FC	8	9	9	8	7	6	7	7	7	7	7	6	5	4	3	4	3	3
Juventus Managua	1	4	5	6	8	7	4	3	2	2	1	2	2	3	4	3	4	4
Fox Villa	9	10	10	10	10	10	10	10	10	10	10	10	10	10	10	10	10	10
Ocotal	7	7	6	4	2	3	1	2	6	6	6	7	7	6	7	6	6	6
Real Madriz	10	6	8	9	9	8	9	8	8	8	9	9	9	9	8	8	8	8
ART Jalapa	3	5	4	5	5	4	6	5	4	5	5	5	6	7	6	7	7	7

Source: int.soccerway.com

=== Playoffs ===
==== Semi-finals ====
===== First leg =====
29 November 2014

Juventus Managua	0-2	Walter Ferretti
		Gerardo Arce 19'; Dani Cadena 33'

Estadio Olimpico del IND, Managua
Referee: Oscar Davila

30 November 2014

Diriangén FC	2–2	Real Estelí
Jose Carballo 35'; Luis Peralta 54'		Carlos Chavarria 34'; Eduardo Praes 87'

Estadio Cacique Diriangen, Diriamba
Referee: William Mendoza

===== Second leg =====
Walter Ferretti	0-0	Juventus Managua
None		None

Walter Ferretti won 2-0 on aggregate.

Real Esteli	1-0	Diriangen
Samuel Wilson 1'		None

Real Esteli won 3-2 on aggregate.

==== Finals ====
===== First leg =====
13 December 2014
20:00 (UTC-6)

Real Estelí	0–1	Walter Ferretti
None		Jason Casco 36'

Estadio Independencia, Esteli

===== Second leg =====
21 December 2014
TBD

Walter Ferretti	0–0	Real Estelí
None		None

Estadio Nacional, Managua
- Walter Ferretti won 1–0 on aggregate score.

== Top scorers ==
Rank	Scorer	Club	Goals
1	(Colombia) Marlon Barrios	Real Madriz	16
2	(Nicaragua) (Spain) Dani Cadena	Deportivo Walter Ferretti	11
3	(Nicaragua) Eulises Pavón	Diriangén FC	8
4	(Colombia) Emiro Gómez	Deportivo Ocotal	8
5	(Nicaragua) Darwin Ramirez	Juventus Managua	7
6	(Nicaragua) Luis Galeano Romario	ART Municipal Jalapa	7
7	(El Salvador) Raul Leguias	Deportivo Walter Ferretti	7
8	(Colombia) Jonathan Donado	UNAN Managua	7
9	(Nicaragua) Carlos Chavarria	Real Esteli F.C.	6
10	(Nicaragua) Emilio Palacios	UNAN Managua	6

Updated to games played on 30 December 2014

=== Scoring ===
- First goal of the season: (Japan) Katzumichi Ikeda for Juventus Managua against Fox Villa, 12 minutes (25 July 2014)
- Fastest goal in a match: TBD minute - (El Salvador) TBD for TBD against TBD ( 2014)
- Goal scored at the latest point in a match: 88 minutes - (Nicaragua) Rene Ruiz for Fox Villa against Juventus Managua (25 July 2014) & (Colombia) Emiro Gomez for Deportivo Ocotal against Real Esteli F.C. (26 July 2014)
- First penalty goal of the season: (Honduras) Mitchell Willams for UNAN Managua against Managua F.C., 28 minutes (27 July 2014)
- Widest winning margin: 3 goals
  - Juventus Managua 5–2 Fox Villa (25 July 2014) & Deportivo Walter Ferretti 3–0 Real Madriz (26 July 2014)
- First hat-trick of the season: (Puerto Rico) TBD for TBD against TBD (2014)
- First own goal of the season: (El Salvador) TBD (TBD) for TBD (2014)
- Most goals in a match: 7 Goals Juventus Managua 5–2 Fox Villa (25 July 2014)
- Most goals by one team in a match: 5 Goals
  - Juventus Managua 5–2 Fox Villa (25 July 2014)
- Most goals in one half by one team: 3 Goals Juventus Managua 5–2 Fox Villa (25 July 2014)
- Most goals scored by losing team: 2 Goals
  - Fox Villa 2–5 Juventus Managua (25 July 2014)
- Most goals by one player in a single match: 2 Goals
  - (Nicaragua) Rene Ruiz for Fox Villa against Juventus Managua (25 July 2014) & (Nicaragua) Samuel Wilson for Real Esteli F.C. against Deportivo Ocotal (26 July 2014)

== List of foreign players in the league ==
This is a list of foreign players in Apertura 2014. The following players:

1. have played at least one apertura game for the respective club.
2. have not been capped for the Nicaragua national football team on any level, independently from the birthplace

A new rule was introduced this year, that clubs can only have five foreign players in a squad.

ART Jalapa

- (Honduras) Luis Maradiaga
- (Honduras) Erling Ruiz
- (Honduras) Arlis Lizandro Andino
- (Honduras) Juan José Tablada

UNAN Managua

- (Honduras) Herberth Cabrera
- (Honduras) Michael William
- (Italy) Giacomo Ratto
- (Panama) George Tinglin
- (Colombia) Jhonatan Donado Cardale
- (Colombia) Carlos William Rovira Terán

Diriangén FC

- (Colombia) Jose Luis Rodriguez
- (El Salvador) (Canada) Saul Tyler Varela Fragoso
- (Panama) Moisés Raúl Leguías
- (Honduras) Armando Cruz
- (Colombia) Camilo Quiñónez
- (Colombia) Jesús Guerrero

Juventus Managua

- (Colombia) Anderson Palacio
- (Guatemala) Jonathan Angelo Castillo
- (Argentina) Allan Maralles
- (Japan) Kazumichi Ikeda

Managua

- (Colombia) Luis Fernándo Gonzáles
- (Colombia) Oscar Palomino
- (Honduras) Jeffry Araica
- (Honduras) Darwing Güity
- (Honduras) Keysi Guerrero

(player released mid season)

Ocotal

- (Honduras) Marcos Alfredo Rivera
- (Honduras) Cristhian Dario Batis
- (Honduras) Nerlin Vallejos
- (Colombia) Evanisto de Jesus Gonzales
- (Colombia) Emiro Manuel Gomez
- (Venezuela) Yitson Rafael Lameda

Real Esteli

- (Uruguay) Rodrigo Valiente
- (Colombia) Andres Camilo Ramìrez
- (Brazil) Allan Kardeck
- (Brazil) Jefferson Geraldo De Almeida
- (Brazil) Daniel Da Silva
- (Brazil) Eduardo Praes

Real Madriz

- (Colombia) Ramón Eloy Iriarte
- (Colombia) Marlon Barrios
- (Colombia) Ornaldo José Torre
- (Colombia) Jose Luis Cassiani
- (Colombia) Jafeth Kaleth Valencia
- (Honduras) Luis Valladares

Fox Villa

- (Honduras) Marvin Lamber

Walter Ferretti

- (Colombia) Luis Fernando Copete
- (Spain) Dani Cadena
- (Uruguay) Bernardo Laureiro
- (Colombia) Deiver Cañate
- (Colombia) Erick Alcazar

== Clausura ==
The 2015 Clausura was the first tournament of the season. It began on 2015.

== Team information ==
Last updated: 2014

=== Personnel and sponsoring (2014 Apertura) ===
Team	Manager	Captain	Kit manufacturer	Shirt sponsor
ART Jalapa	(Nicaragua) Tyson Acevedo	(Nicaragua) Luis M. Galeano	TBD	Claro, Argoris
Diriangén	(Argentina) Roberto Chanampe	(Nicaragua) David Solorzano	Joma	Claro, Totto
Fox Villa	(Nicaragua) Mario Aburto	(Spain) Alex Piache	TBD	CARUNA R.L., Alcaldía de Jinotepe and GRH Logistics
UCEM Juventus F.C.	(Nicaragua) Douglas Urbina	(Nicaragua) Emerson Salinas	TBD	TBD
Managua F.C.	(Nicaragua) Emilio Aburto	TBD	TBD	TBD
Deportivo Ocotal	(Nicaragua) Eduardo Alonso	(Nicaragua) Mario Morales	TBD	TBD
Real Madriz	(Honduras) Mario Cruz	(Nicaragua) Enoc Salgado	TBD	TBD
Real Esteli F.C.	(Nicaragua) Ramón Otoniel Olivas	(Honduras) (Nicaragua) Elmer Mejia	TBD	TBD
UNAN Managua	(Colombia) Luis Montaño	(Nicaragua) Roberto C Vanegas	TBD	UNAN Managua
Walter Ferretti	(Brazil) Flavio da Silva	(Nicaragua) Denis Espinoza	TBD	TBD

== Managerial Changes ==
=== Before the season ===
Team	Outgoing manager	Manner of departure	Date of vacancy	Replaced by	Date of appointment
ART Jalapa	(Nicaragua) Leonididas Rodriguez	Resigned	2015	(Nicaragua) Tyson Acevedo	2015

=== During the season ===
Team	Outgoing manager	Manner of departure	Date of vacancy	Replaced by	Date of appointment
Managua F.C.	(Nicaragua) Emilio Aburto	Resigned	29 January 2015	(Nicaragua) Carlos Zambrana	29 January 2015
Real Madriz	(Honduras) Mario Cruz	Resigned	22 February 2015	(Nicaragua) Leonidas Rodriguez	February 2015
Deportivo Ocotal	(Nicaragua) Vidal Alonso	Resigned	24 February 2015	(El Salvador) Juan Ramon Trejo	25 February 2015
UNAN Managua	(Colombia) Luis Montaño	Resigned	March 2015	(Nicaragua) Julio Madrigal	March 2015

=== Regular season ===
The regular season began on 2015. The top four finishers will move on to the next stage of the competition.

==== Standings ====
Pos	Team	Pld	W	D	L	GF	GA	GD	Pts	Qualification
1	Real Esteli	18	13	3	2	54	9	+45	42	Semi-finals Group
2	Walter Ferretti	18	12	4	2	34	10	+24	40	Semi-finals Group
3	Diriangén FC	18	9	4	5	28	16	+12	31	Semi-finals Group
4	ART Jalapa	18	6	9	3	28	25	+3	27	Semi-finals Group
5	Managua	18	6	6	6	26	23	+3	24	
6	Ocotal	18	6	4	8	27	35	−8	22	
7	Juventus Managua	18	5	5	8	26	43	−17	20	
8	Real Madriz	18	3	7	8	26	32	−6	16	
9	UNAN Managua	18	3	6	9	14	29	−15	15	
10	Fox Villa	18	1	4	13	13	54	−41	7	

Updated to match(es) played on May 2015. Source:
Rules for classification: 1) points; 2) goal difference; 3) number of goals scored.

==== Results ====
Home \ Away	JAL	DIR	FVI	JUV	MAN	OCO	RES	RMD	UNA	WFE
ART Jalapa		1–0	2–0	1–1	1–1	3–0	1–1	1–1	2–0	4–3
Diriangén FC	0–1		2–1	4–0	2–0	5–3	0–0	3–0	1–0	1–0
Fox Villa	2–1	1–3		1–3	1–3	0–1	0–7	0–2	1–1	0–4
Juventus Managua	2–2	3–2	1–1		1–1	5–1	1–6	3–4	2–1	1–1
Managua	2–2	0–2	4–0	4–0		1–2	0–1	3–2	1–1	0–2
Ocotal	1–1	1–1	4–2	4–1	1–1		0–2	2–0	3–1	1–2
Real Esteli	5–1	2–0	9–0	2–1	0–0	3–0		3–0	6–0	1–2
Real Madriz	3–3	1–1	2–2	5–0	2–3	2–2	1–3		0–0	0–1
UNAN Managua	2–0	1–1	1–1	2–2	0–2	4–1	0–2	2–1		0–0
Walter Ferretti	1–1	1–0	4–0	3–0	3–0	1–0	2–1	0–0	4–0	

Updated to match(es) played on unknown. Source:
Legend: Blue = home team win; Yellow = draw; Red = away team win.

==== Positions by round ====
Team ╲ Round	1	2	3	4	5	6	7	8	9	10	11	12	13	14	15	16	17	18
Real Esteli	1	1	1	1	2		2	2	1	1	2	2	2	2	1	1	1	1
Managua	3	6	3	4	4		3	5	5	5	6	5	5	4	4	4	4	5
Walter Ferretti	4	2	2	2	1		1	1	2	2	1	1	1	1	2	2	2	2
UNAN Managua	10	4	5	6	6		7	7	6	7	7	9	9	9	9	9	9	9
Diriangén FC	8	5	6	5	5		4	4	3	3	3	3	3	3	3	3	3	3
Juventus Managua	6	8	7	8	7		6	6	7	9	9	8	7	7	7	7	7	7
Fox Villa	5	7	9	9	9		8	10	10	10	10	10	10	10	10	10	10	10
Ocotal	7	10	10	10	10		10	9	9	6	5	6	6	6	6	6	6	6
Real Madriz	9	9	8	7	8		9	8	8	8	8	7	8	8	8	8	8	8
ART Jalapa	2	3	4	3	3		5	3	4	4	4	4	4	5	5	5	5	4

=== Playoffs ===
==== Semi-finals ====
===== First leg =====
24 May 2015

ART Municipal Jalapa	1-0	Real Estelí
Luis Galeano 81'		None

Estadio Alejandro Ramos de Nueva Segovia, Jalapa

24 May 2015

Diriangén FC	2-0	Walter Ferretti
Juan Carlos Narváez 58'; José Luis “Puma” Rodríguez 70'		None

Estadio Cacique Diriangen, Diriamba

===== Second leg =====
30 May 2015

Walter Ferretti	0-0	Diriangen
None		None

Diriangen won 2-0 on aggregate.

31 May 2015

Real Esteli	0-0	ART Municipal Jalapa
Rudel Calero 24' & TBD 82'; Juan Barrera 73'		Luis Galeano 46'

Estadio Independencia, Esteli

Real Esteli won 3-2 on aggregate.

==== Finals ====
===== First leg =====
27 June 2015
20:00 (UTC-6)

Real Esteli	2-1	Diriangén FC
Manuel Rosas 13' & Samuel Wilson 43'		Luis Peralta 80'

Estadio Independencia, Esteli

===== Second leg =====
July 2015
TBD

Diriangén FC	0–0	Real Esteli
None		None

- Real Esteli F.C. won 2–1 on aggregate score.

== List of foreign players in the league ==
This is a list of foreign players in Clausura 2015. The following players:

1. have played at least one apertura game for the respective club.
2. have not been capped for the Nicaragua national football team on any level, independently from the birthplace

A new rule was introduced this year, that clubs can only have five foreign players in a squad.

ART Jalapa

- (Honduras) Luis Maradiaga
- (Honduras) Erling Ruiz
- (Honduras) Arlis Lizandro Andino
- (Honduras) Juan José Tablada
- (Honduras) Mario Borja

UNAN Managua

- (Honduras) Herberth Cabrera
- (Honduras) Michael William
- (Panama) George Tinglin
- (Colombia) Freider Mattos Pombo
- (Colombia) Rodrigo Hernández Martínez
- (Colombia) Luis Murillo

Diriangén FC

- (Argentina) Lucas Martella
- (Colombia) Jose Luis Rodriguez
- (Colombia) Jesús Guerrero
- (Colombia) Edwin Mejia
- (Colombia) Brandon Mena
- (Colombia) Camilo Quiñonez

Juventus Managua

- (Colombia) Anderson Palacio
- (Colombia) Roland Quintero
- (Honduras) Ronny Colón
- (Honduras) Cesar Salandía
- (Honduras) Rudy Williams

Managua

- (Colombia) Luis Fernándo Gonzáles
- (Colombia) Oscar Palomino
- (Honduras) Jeffry Araica
- (Honduras) Darwing Güity
- (Honduras) Keysi Guerrero

(player released mid season)

Ocotal

- (Honduras) Marcos Alfredo Rivera
- (Colombia) Alexander Trimiñio Motta
- (Colombia) Miguel Montalvo
- (Colombia) Evanisto de Jesus Gonzales
- (Colombia) Emiro Manuel Gomez
- (Venezuela) Yitson Rafael Lameda

Real Esteli

- (Colombia) Devis Gutiérrez
- (Brazil) Vinicius De Sousa
- (Colombia) Jesus Valencia
- (Colombia) Óscar Movil
- (Colombia) Gabriel Martínez
- (Uruguay) Miguel Ángel Lavié

Real Madriz

- (Colombia) Miguel Estrada
- (Colombia) Marlon Barrios
- (Honduras) Luis Valladares
- (Honduras) Adin Barahona
- (Colombia) José Antonio Julio Carballo
- (Honduras) Grevin Antonio Cerrato

Fox Villa

- (Spain) Alex Piache
- (Mexico) Hugo Zambrano
- (Mexico) Alberto García
- (Mexico) Jamie Romo
- (Mexico) Roel Salinas

Walter Ferretti

- (Uruguay) Bernardo Laureiro
- (Colombia) Erick Alcazar
- (Colombia) Eder Munive
- (Brazil) Maycon Santana
- (Brazil) Carlos Conceição Junior
- (Uruguay) Gonzalo Ancheta

== Championship playoff ==
=== First leg ===
11 July 2015

Real Estelí	0-1	Walter Ferretti
None		Bernardo Laureiro 55'

Estadio Independencia, Estelí

=== Second leg ===
20 July 2015

Walter Ferretti	1-1	Real Estelí
Daniel Cadena 2'		Samuel Wilson 48' (pen.)

Nicaragua National Football Stadium, Managua
- Walter Ferretti won 2–1 on aggregate score.

Primera Division
2015 Champion

3rd title

== Aggregate table ==
Pos	Team	Pld	W	D	L	GF	GA	GD	Pts	Qualification or relegation
1	Walter Ferretti	36	23	10	3	63	13	+50	79	Qualification for 2015–16 CONCACAF Champions League
2	Real Esteli	36	23	9	4	82	17	+65	78	
3	Diriangén	36	19	7	10	45	27	+18	64	
4	Jalapa	36	13	14	9	46	47	−1	53	
5	Managua F.C.	36	13	11	12	49	38	+11	50	
6	Juventus Managua	36	13	10	13	50	73	−23	49	
7	Ocotal	36	13	8	15	49	56	−7	47	
8	Real Madriz	36	9	12	15	51	59	−8	39	
9	UNAN Managua	36	8	9	19	40	65	−25	33	Relegation play-off
10	Fox Villa (R)	36	1	4	31	23	109	−86	7	Relegation to 2015–16 Segunda División de Fútbol de Nicaragua

Updated to match(es) played on May 2015. Source:
Rules for classification: 1) points; 2) goal difference; 3) number of goals scored.
(R) Relegated
