= Nils Hellsten =

Nils Hellsten may refer to:

- Nils Hellsten (fencer) (1886–1962), Swedish fencer; bronze medallist at the 1924 Summer Olympics
- Nils Hellsten (gymnast) (1885–1963), Swedish gymnast; gold medallist at the 1908 Summer Olympics
