= Compagna =

Compagna' could refer to:

- Internationaler Verein Freundinnen junger Mädchen
- Renzo Compagna
- Francesco Compagna
