= Carlos Miguel =

Carlos Miguel may refer to:

- Carlos Miguel (fencer) (1892–1974), Spanish fencer
- Carlos Miguel Aidar (born 1946), Brazilian lawyer and sports chairman
- Carlos Miguel (politician) (born 1957), Portuguese lawyer and politician
- Carlos Miguel (footballer, born 1972) (Carlos Miguel da Silva Júnior), Brazilian football midfielder
- Carlos Miguel (footballer, born 1998) (Carlos Miguel dos Santos Pereira), Brazilian football goalkeeper
- Carlos Miguel Suarez, Mexican actor
