= Julio González =

Julio González may refer to:

== Arts and entertainment ==
- Julio González (sculptor) (1876–1942), Spanish sculptor
- Julio González, member of Los Chichos gypsy band
- Julio G, American radio DJ and musician

== Politics and government ==
- Julio González Verdugo (1882–?), Chilean politician
- Julio Gonzalez (Florida politician) (born 1964), U.S. politician, member of the Florida House of Representatives

== Sportspeople ==
=== Association football ===
- Julio González (football manager) (born 1953), Uruguayan football manager
- Julio González (footballer, born 1981), Paraguayan football striker
- Julio González (footballer, born 1991), Mexican football goalkeeper
- Julio González (footballer, born 1992), Paraguayan football defender

=== Baseball ===
- Julio González (pitcher) (1920–1991), Cuban baseball player
- Julio González (infielder) (born 1952), Puerto Rican baseball player

=== Boxing ===
- Julio González (Cuban boxer) (born 1961), Cuban boxer
- Julio César González (1976–2012), Mexican light-heavyweight boxer

=== Other sports ===
- Julio González (fencer) (1902–?), Spanish Olympic fencer
- Julio González (sport shooter) (1943–2023), Salvadoran sports shooter

== Other ==
- Julio González (arsonist) (1954–2016), Cuban responsible for the 1990 Happy Land Fire
