= Mañalich =

Mañalich is a surname. Notable people with the surname include:

- Jaime Mañalich (born 1954), Chilean nephrologist and politician
- Ramíro Mañalich (1887–?), Cuban fencer
- Roberto Mañalich (1906–?), Cuban fencer
