= Wenceslao Paunero =

Wenceslao Paunero may refer to

- Wenceslao Paunero (general) (1805–1871), Argentine general
- Wenceslao Paunero (fencer) (1887–1937), Argentine fencer
