= Bergsland =

Bergsland may refer to:

- Egil Bergsland (1924–2007), Norwegian politician
- Einar Bergsland (1910–1982), Norwegian Nordic skier
- Hans Bergsland (1878–1956), Norwegian Olympic fencer
- Jacob Bergsland (1890–1974), Norwegian fencer
- Knut Bergsland (1914–1998), Norwegian linguist
- Per Bergsland (1918–1992), Norwegian World War II prisoner of war, one of three to reach freedom in the "Great Escape"
