= Óscar Acevedo =

Nicaragua footballer

Personal information
- Full name: Óscar José Acevedo Arana
- Date of birth: 18 March 1997 (age 29)
- Place of birth: Estelí, Nicaragua
- Height: 1.80 m (5 ft 11 in)
- Position: Left-back

Team information
- Current team: FAS
- Number: 23

Youth career
- Isidro Metapán

Senior career*
Years	Team	Apps	(Gls)
2014–2015	Fox Villa	17	(0)
2015–	Real Estelí	176	(8)

International career^{‡}
2017	Nicaragua U21	4	(0)
2022–	Nicaragua	37	(2)
- * Club domestic league appearances and goals as of 22:00, 16 November 2025 (UTC) ‡ National team caps and goals as of 22:00, 16 November 2025 (UTC)

Óscar José Acevedo Arana (born 18 March 1997) is a Nicaraguan professional footballer who plays as a left-back for the Salvadoran Primera División club FAS and the Nicaragua national team.

== Club career ==
Acevedo began his senior career with Fox Villa in the Nicaraguan Primera División in 2014. In 2015, he moved over to Real Estelí. On 16 January 2018, he was formally promoted to Real Estelí's senior team. He won the Nicaraguan Liga Primera 5 teams, including a double Apertura and Clausura in 2023. In October 2025, he received xenophobic abuse from Costa Rican fans of the club Deportivo Saprissa.

== International career ==
Acevedo was first called up to the senior Nicaragua national team for a set of friendlies in November 2017.

== International goals ==
Scores and results list Nicaragua's goal tally first.

No.	Date	Venue	Opponent	Score	Result	Competition
1.	27 March 2026	Krestovsky Stadium, Saint Petersburg, Russia	Russia	1–1	1–3	Friendly

== Honours ==
Real Estelí

- Liga Primera: 2019 Clausura, 2019 Apertura, 2020 Clausura, 2020 Apertura, 2022 Apertura, 2023 Clausura
