= Giulio Basletta =

Italian fencer (1890–1975)

Personal information
- Born: 5 May 1890 Vigevano, Italy
- Died: 5 February 1975 (aged 84) Vigevano, Italy

Sport
- Sport: Fencing
Medal record
Men's fencing
Representing Italy
Olympic Games
Bronze medal – third place	1924 Paris	Épée, team
Gold medal – first place	1928 Amsterdam	Épée, team

Giulio Basletta (5 May 1890 – 5 February 1975) was an Italian fencer. He won a bronze medal at the 1924 Summer Olympics and a gold at the 1928 Summer Olympics.
