= Georges Tainturier =

French fencer (1890–1943)

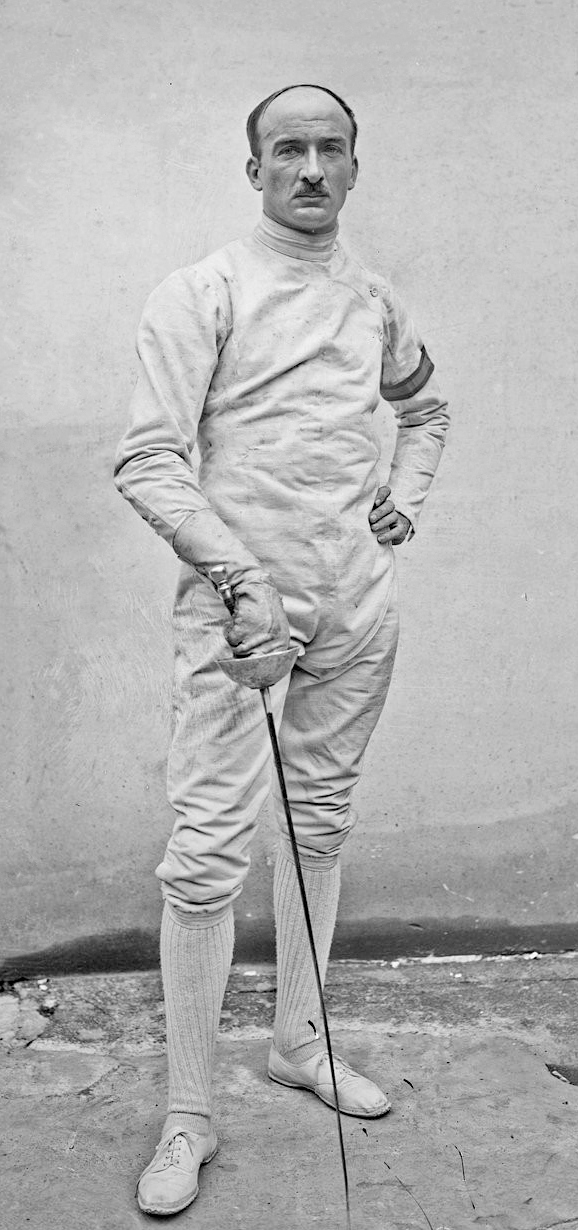
- Georges Tainturier in 1922

Personal information
- Born: 20 May 1890
- Died: 7 December 1943 (aged 53)

Sport
- Sport: Fencing
- Club: Salle Bouché; Cercle de l'Escrime à l'Épée
Medal record
Representing France
Olympic Games
Gold medal – first place	1924 Paris	Team épée
Gold medal – first place	1932 Los Angeles	Team épée

Georges Charles Armand Tainturier (20 May 1890 – 7 December 1943) was a French fencer who won team épée gold medals at the 1924 and 1932 Olympics. In 1926 he won an unofficial world title in the individual épée.

Tainturier fought in World War I, was wounded, received the Croix de Guerre and was made a Knight of the Legion of Honor. During World War II he was a prominent member of the French Resistance. He was arrested in 1942 and executed in 1943. A fencing club is named after him in Compiègne.
