= Charles Biscoe =

British fencer

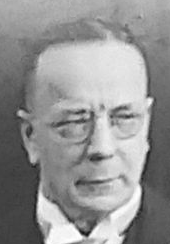

Personal information
- Nickname: Charlie
- Born: Karl Heinrich Remigius Biscoe; 28 June 1875 Frankfurt, Germany
- Died: 22 December 1948 (aged 73) Cirencester, England

Sport
- Sport: Fencing

Karl Heinrich Remigius Biscoe (28 June 1875 – 22 December 1948) better known as Charles Henry Biscoe was a German born British fencer, he competed mainly in the épée.

== Biography ==
He competed at two Olympic Games.

In 1924, he was selected to represent Great Britain at the 1924 Summer Olympics in Paris. He competed in both the individual épée event and the team épée event. Also in 1924, he won the épée title at the British Fencing Championships.

Four years later in 1928 he competed at his second Olympic Games when he took part in the individual épée event and the team épée event again.
