= Ahmed Salem Hassan =

Egyptian cyclist

Personal information
- Full name: Ahmed Salem Hassan

Cycling career
- Sport: Cycling

Ahmed Salem Hassan was an Egyptian cyclist. He competed in two events at the 1924 Summer Olympics.
