= Georges Conraux =

French fencer

Personal information
- Born: 20 July 1885
- Died: 14 May 1957 (aged 71)

Sport
- Sport: Fencing

Georges Conraux (20 July 1885 – 14 May 1957) was a French fencer. He competed in the individual and team sabre competition at the 1924 Summer Olympics.
