= Gaston Cornereau =

French fencer

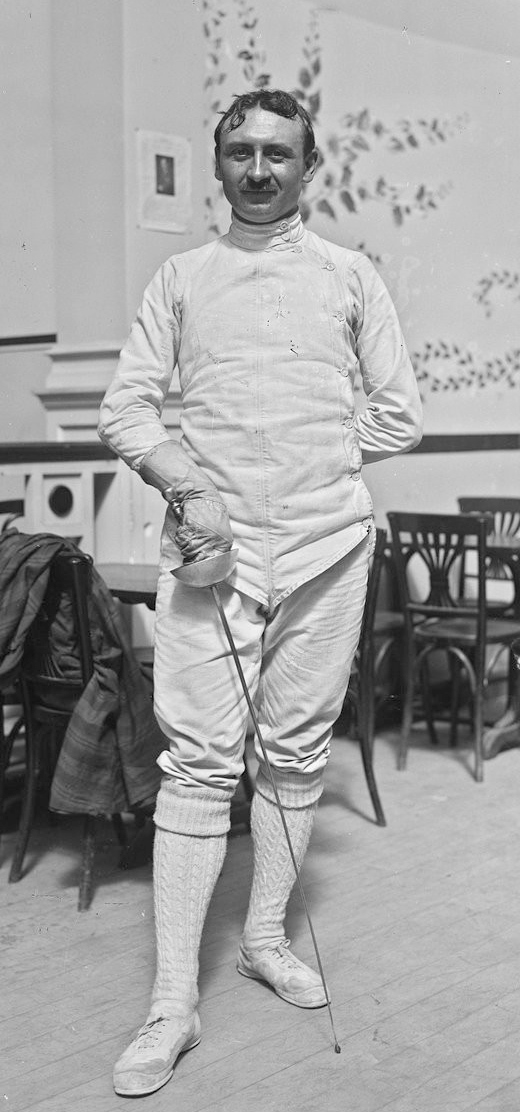
- Gaston Cornereau at the 1922 European Championships

Personal information
- Born: 31 August 1888 Gannat, Allier, France
- Died: 5 July 1944 (aged 55)

Sport
- Sport: Fencing

Gaston Cornereau (31 August 1888, Gannat – 5 July 1944) was a French fencer. He placed fourth in the individual épée competition at the 1924 Summer Olympics.
