= Donald Waldhaus =

American fencer

Personal information
- Born: March 31, 1895 Bridgeport, Connecticut, United States
- Died: April 17, 1975 (aged 80) Shelton, Connecticut, United States

Sport
- Sport: Fencing

Donald Waldhaus (March 31, 1895 – April 17, 1975) was an American fencer. He competed in the team épée event at the 1924 Summer Olympics.
