= Fernando Guillén (fencer) =

Spanish fencer

Personal information
- Born: 1895 Barcelona, Spain
- Died: 1925 (aged 29–30)

Sport
- Sport: Fencing

Fernando Guillén (1895–1925) was a Spanish fencer. He competed in the individual and team sabre events at the 1924 Summer Olympics.
