= Manuel Toledo =

Spanish fencer

Personal information
- Born: 26 January 1880
- Died: 22 June 1941 (aged 61)

Sport
- Sport: Fencing

Manuel Toledo (26 January 1880 – 22 June 1941) was a Spanish fencer. He competed in the individual sabre event at the 1924 Summer Olympics.
