= Omer Berck =

Belgian fencer (1895–1926)

Personal information
- Born: 5 February 1895
- Died: 12 February 1926 (aged 31)

Sport
- Sport: Fencing

Omer Berck (5 February 1895 – 12 February 1926) was a Belgian fencer. He competed in the individual sabre competitions at the 1924 Summer Olympics.
