= Enrique Conill =

Cuban sailor

Personal information
- Full name: Enrique Juan José Victoriano Conill y Rafecas
- Born: 6 October 1878 Havana, Captaincy General of Cuba, Spanish Empire
- Died: 24 November 1966 (aged 88) Miami, Florida, U.S.

Sport

Sailing career
- Class: 6 Metre
- Updated on 6 March 2015

Enrique Juan José Victoriano Conill y Rafecas (October 1878 – 3 January 1970) was a sailor from Cuba, who represented his country at the 1924 Summer Olympics in Le Havre, France.

== Sources ==
- "Enrique Conill Bio, Stats, and Results". Olympic Sports. Sports-Reference.com. Archived from the original on 17 April 2020.
- Les Jeux de la VIIIe Olympiade Paris 1924:rapport official (PDF) (in French). Paris: Librairie de France: Comité Olympique Français. 1924. Archived from the original (PDF) on 21 April 2013.
