= Nils Hellsten (gymnast) =

Swedish artistic gymnast

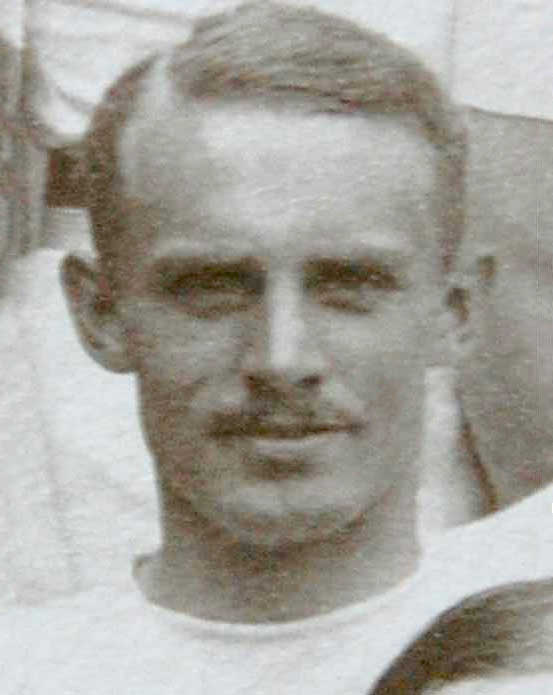
- Hellsten c. 1908

Personal information
- Full name: Nils Robert Hellsten
- Born: 7 October 1885 Stockholm, United Kingdoms of Sweden and Norway
- Died: 14 November 1963 (aged 78) Stockholm, Sweden

Gymnastics career
- Discipline: Men's artistic gymnastics
- Country represented: Sweden
- Club: Stockholms Gymnastikförening
Medal record
Men's artistic gymnastics
Representing Sweden
Olympic Games
Gold medal – first place	1908 London	Team

Nils Robert Hellsten (7 October 1885 – 14 November 1963) was a Swedish gymnast who competed in the 1908 Summer Olympics. He was part of the Swedish team that won the all-around gold medal. He is not related to the Olympic fencer Nils Hellsten.
