= Francisco Bollini =

Argentine fencer

Personal information
- Full name: Francisco Cándido Bollini
- Born: 1888 Buenos Aires, Argentina
- Died: Unknown

Sport
- Sport: Fencing

Francisco Bollini (born 1888, date of death unknown) was an Argentine fencer. He competed in the individual épée competition at the 1924 Summer Olympics.
