= Nazli Madkour =

Egyptian artist

- Education: University of Cairo

Nazli Madkour or Nāzlī Madkūr (Arabic: نازلي مدكور; born 1949) is an Egyptian visual artist.

== Early life and education ==
Madkour was born on 25 February 1949 in Cairo, Egypt. She has a BA in economy and political science from the University of Cairo (1971), and a diploma in business administration management (1977) and a master's degree (1980) from The American University in Cairo. Her masters thesis was on Egyptian Defense Programs and their Impact on the Development of Egypt.

She worked for the United Nations as a researcher on family planning from 1972 to 1978, and as an economic expert at the Industrial Development Centre for Arab States before becoming a full time artist in 1981.

== Artistic career ==
Madkour has held solo exhibitions since 1982 in many galleries in Egypt and elsewhere, and her works are held in collections including those of the Egyptian Modern Art Museum and Murray Edwards College, Cambridge.

In 1989 she wrote a book in Arabic whose title translates as Egyptian Women and Artistic Creativity, which was published by Association of Arab Women Solidarity; it was republished in English in 1993 by the State Information Department as Women and Art in Egypt.

In 2005 she illustrated a limited edition of Arabian Nights and Days by Naguib Mahfouz for the American Limited Editions Club; the prints were exhibited at the Corcoran Gallery in Washington, D.C. in 2005.

== Selected publications ==
- Madkour, Nazli (1991). Women and art in Egypt. Arab Republic of Egypt, State Information Service. OCLC 933301656.
- Mahfouz, Naguib (2005). Arabian Nights and Days. Seven original seriagraph prints by Nazli Madkour. New York: Limited Editions Club. ISBN 9780385468886.
