= Håkon Bryhn =

Norwegian sailor (1901–1968)

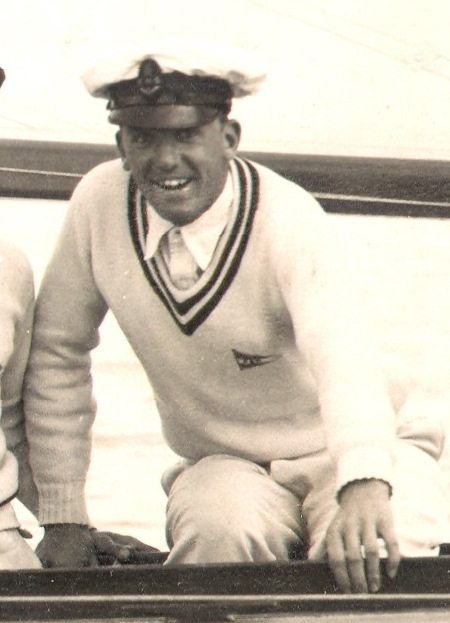

Medal record

Men's sailing

Representing Norway
Gold medal – first place	1928 Amsterdam	6 metre class

Håkon P. Bryhn (14 August 1901 – 15 December 1968) was a Norwegian sailor who competed in the 1928 Summer Olympics.

In 1928 he won the gold medal as crew member of the Norwegian boat Norna in the 6 metre class event.
