= Léon Tom =

Belgian fencer and bobsledder

Personal information
- Born: 25 October 1888 Antwerp, Belgium

Sport
- Sport: Fencing
Medal record
Men's fencing
Representing Belgium
Olympic Games
Silver medal – second place	1920 Antwerp	Épée, team
Silver medal – second place	1924 Paris	Épée, team

Léon Tom (born 25 October 1888, date of death unknown) was a Belgian épée, foil and sabre fencer and bobsledder. He won two silver medals in the team épée competition at the 1920 and 1924 Summer Olympics. He also competed in the bobsleigh event at the 1928 Winter Olympics.
