= Jesús López de Lara =

Spanish fencer

Personal information
- Born: 22 March 1892 Madrid, Spain

Sport
- Sport: Fencing

Jesús López de Lara (born 22 March 1892, date of death unknown) was a Spanish Olympic fencer. He competed in the team épée and sabre events at the 1924 Summer Olympics.
