= Jules Maes =

Belgian fencer

Personal information
- Born: 1882
- Died: Unknown

Sport
- Sport: Fencing

Jules Maes (born 1882) was a Belgian fencer. He competed in the individual sabre competition at the 1924 Summer Olympics.
