= Ernest Gignoux =

American fencer

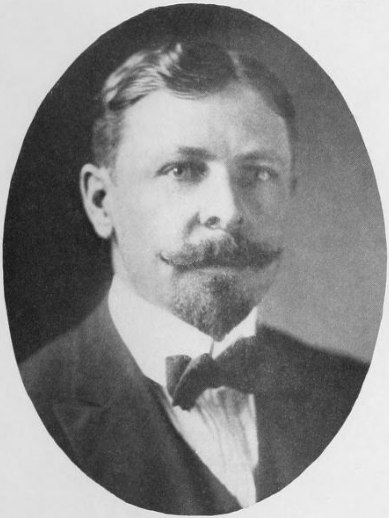

Personal information
- Full name: John Ernest Gignoux
- Born: August 26, 1874 Jersey City, New Jersey, United States
- Died: September 14, 1955 (aged 81)

Sport
- Sport: Fencing
- College team: Cornell

Ernest Gignoux (August 26, 1874 – September 14, 1955) was an American epée, foil and sabre fencer. He competed at the 1912 and 1924 Summer Olympics. He was a doctor and a U.S. national fencing champion.
