= Boven Bolivia =

- Hamlet
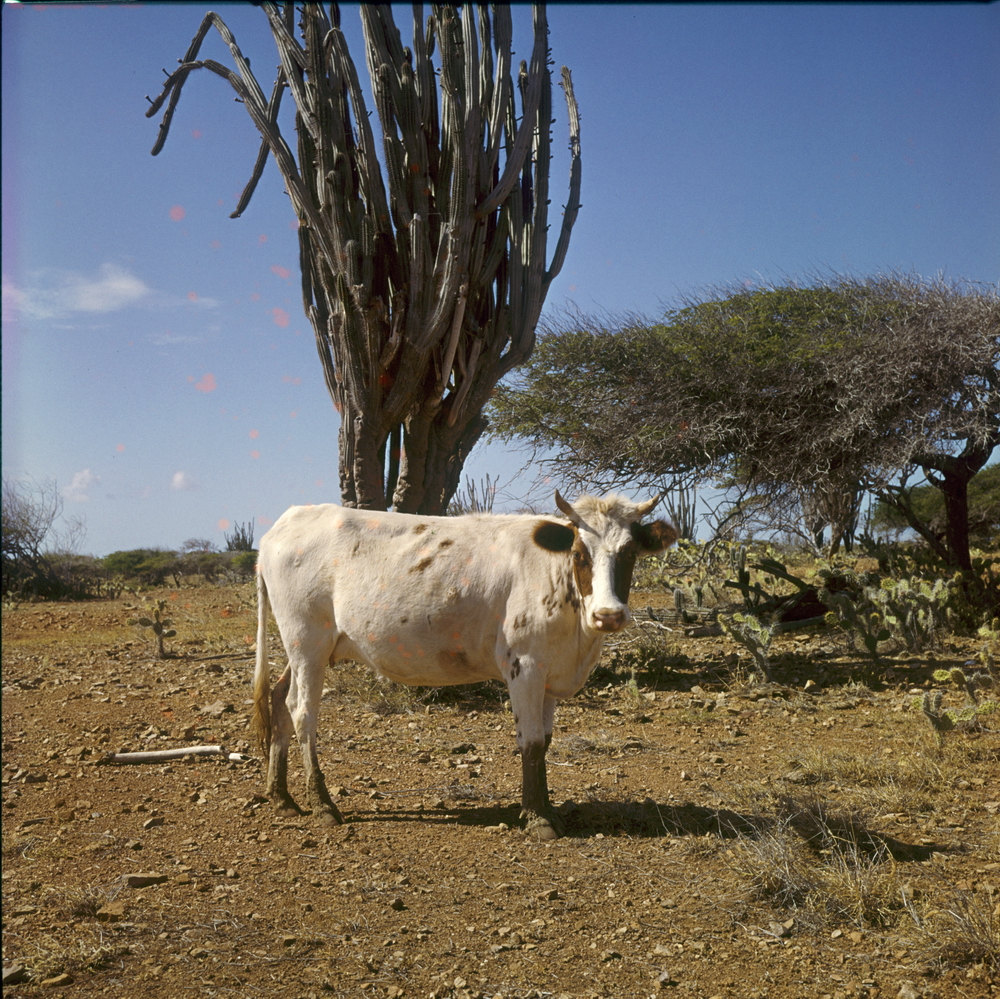
- A cow on the former plantation

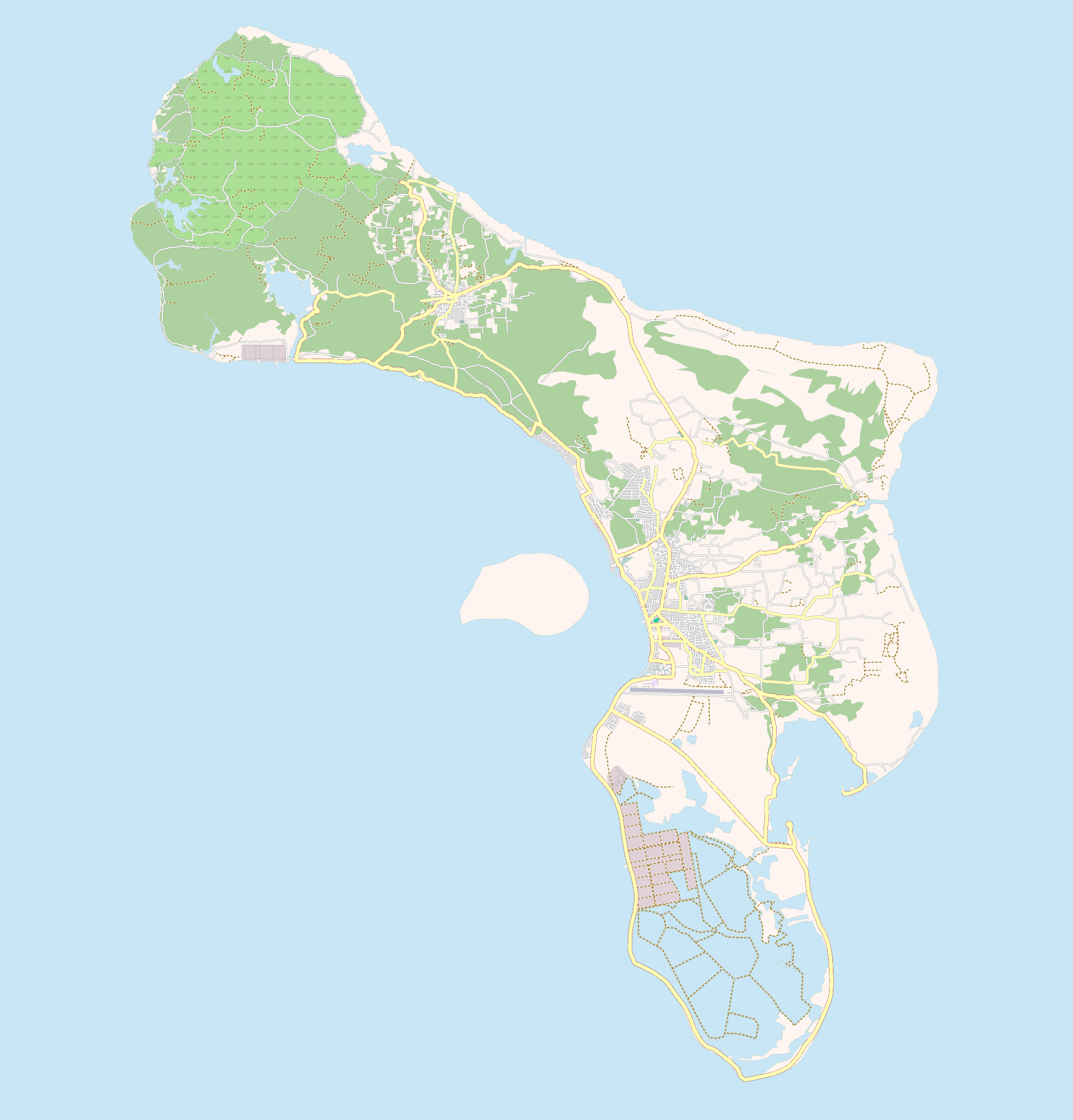
- Location in Bonaire
- Coordinates: 12°10′55″N 68°13′05″W
- Country: Netherlands
- Public body: Bonaire

Boven Bolivia is a hamlet on the island of Bonaire at the head of a lagoon on the island's east coast.

Boven Bolivia started as a plantation. Guano was discovered in the late 19th century, however the plantation was later abandoned and only ruins remain.
