= Jan Tille =

Czech fencer

Personal information
- Born: 27 April 1891 Prague, Austria-Hungary
- Died: 18 July 1966 (aged 75) Olomouc, Czechoslovakia

Sport
- Sport: Fencing

Jan Tille (27 April 1891 – 18 July 1966) was a Czechoslovak fencer. He competed at the 1924 and 1928 Summer Olympics.
