= Leon Shore =

American fencer

Personal information
- Born: July 10, 1892 Washington, District of Columbia, United States
- Died: December 25, 1942 (aged 50) Washington, District of Columbia, United States

Sport
- Sport: Fencing

Leon Shore (July 10, 1892 – December 25, 1942) was an American fencer. He competed in the team épée event at the 1924 Summer Olympics.
