= Bror Lagercrantz =

Swedish fencer (1894–1981)

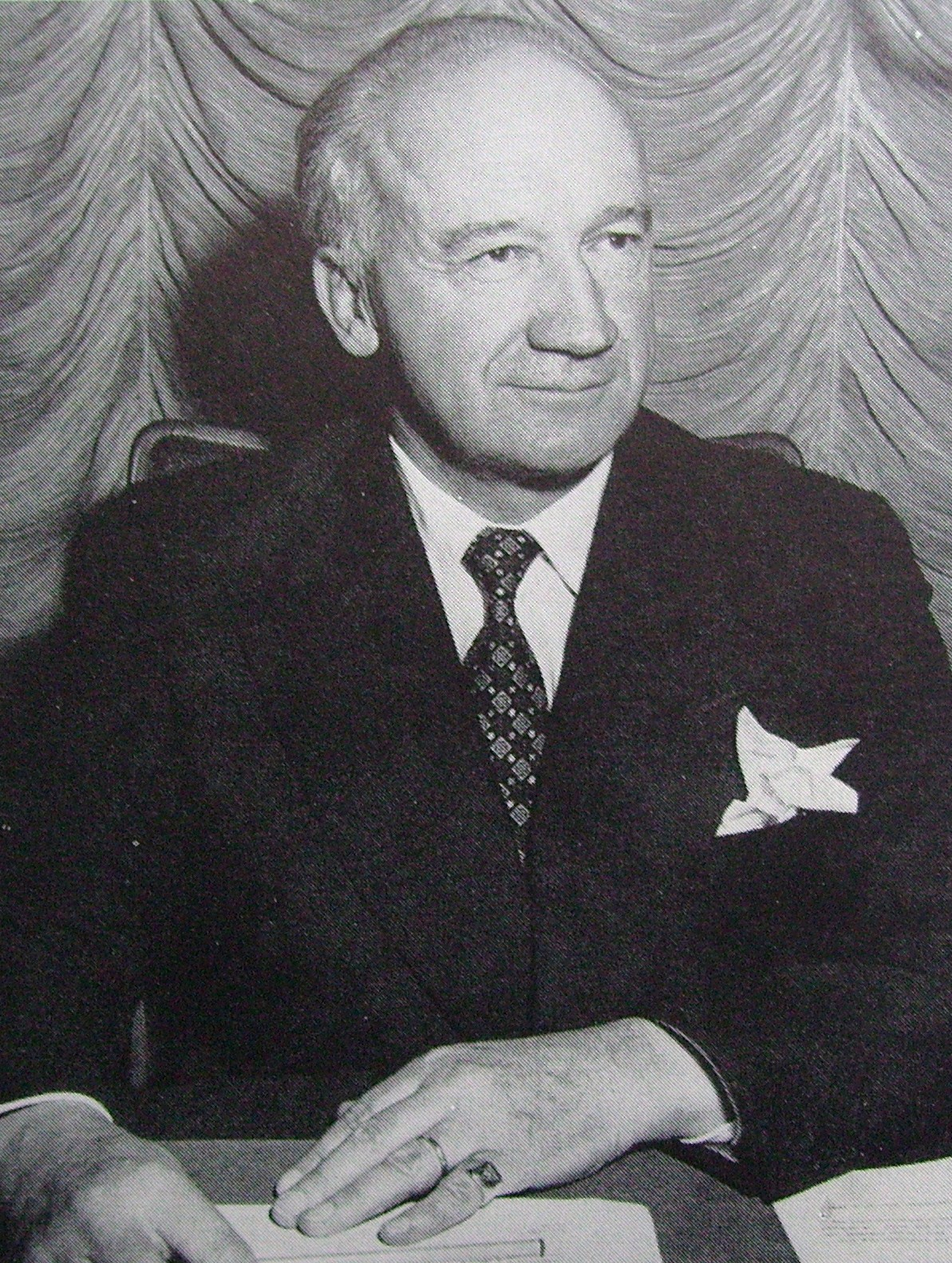

Personal information
- Born: 28 September 1894 Södertälje, Stockholm Sweden
- Died: 22 January 1981 (aged 86) Virsbo, Sweden

Sport
- Sport: Fencing

Bror Lagercrantz (28 September 1894 – 22 January 1981) was a Swedish fencer. He competed in the individual épée at the 1924 Summer Olympics.
