= Antonio Saavedra =

Cuban sailor

Personal information
- Full name: Antonio F. Saavedra
- Nationality: Cuban
- Born: 1882

Sport

Sailing career
- Class: 6 Metre
Competition record
Sailing
Representing Cuba
Olympic Games
1924 Le Havre	6 Metre
- Updated on 6 March 2015

Antonio F. Saavedra (1882 – unknown) was a sailor from Cuba, who represented his country at the 1924 Summer Olympics in Le Havre, France.
