= Theodoros Foustanos =

Greek fencer

Personal information
- Born: 1903

Sport
- Sport: Fencing

Theodoros Foustanos (Greek: Θεόδωρος Φουστάνος) (born 1903) was a Greek fencer. He competed in the individual foil and épée competitions at the 1924 Summer Olympics.
