= Julio González (fencer) =

Spanish fencer

Personal information
- Born: 1902

Sport
- Sport: Fencing

Julio González (born 1902, date of death unknown) was a Spanish fencer. He competed in the individual and team sabre events at the 1924 Summer Olympics.
