= Eugène Empeyta =

Swiss fencer

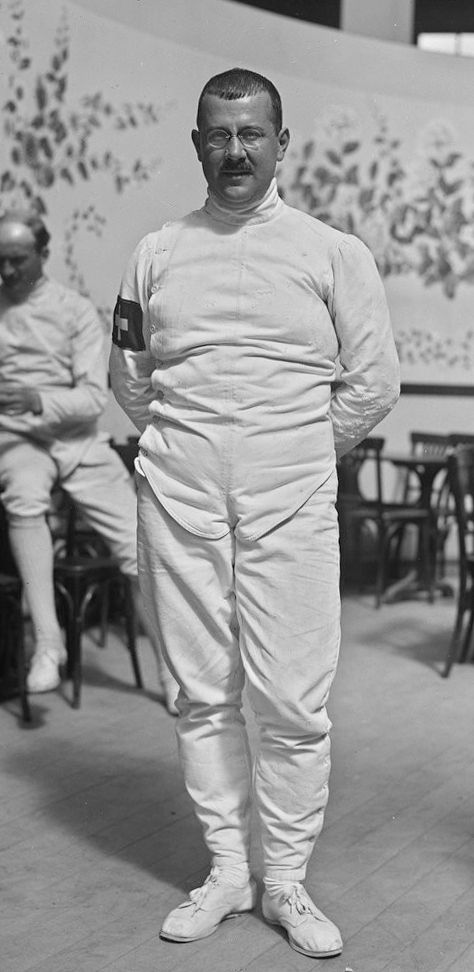
- Eugène Empeyta at the 1922 European Championships

Personal information
- Born: 12 September 1892 Geneva, Switzerland
- Died: 20 May 1951 (aged 58) Geneva, Switzerland

Sport
- Sport: Fencing
- Club: SEG, Genève

Eugène Empeyta (12 September 1892 – 20 May 1951) was a Swiss fencer. He competed in foil and épée events at the 1920, 1924 and 1928 Summer Olympics with the best result of fifth place in the team épée in 1920. From 1929 to 1932 he served as president of the Fédération Internationale d'Escrime, and in 1924–1925 and 1939–1943 he headed the Swiss Fencing Federation.
