= Viggo Stilling-Andersen =

Danish fencer

Personal information
- Born: 6 January 1893 Frederiksberg, Denmark
- Died: 11 December 1967 (aged 74) Gentofte, Denmark

Sport
- Sport: Fencing

Viggo Stilling-Andersen (6 January 1893 – 12 November 1967) was a Danish fencer. He competed at two Olympic Games.
