= Pedro Nazar =

Argentine fencer

Personal information
- Full name: Rómulo Pedro Nazar Anchorena
- Born: 23 October 1892 Buenos Aires, Argentina
- Died: 17 March 1966 (aged 73) Buenos Aires, Argentina

Sport
- Sport: Fencing

Pedro Nazar (23 October 1892 – 17 March 1966) was an Argentine fencer. He competed in the individual and team épée competitions at the 1924 Summer Olympics.
