= Afonso López =

Cuban fencer

Personal information
- Full name: Afonso Mario López

Sport
- Sport: Fencing

Afonso Mario López was a Cuban fencer. He competed in the team épée competition at the 1924 Summer Olympics.
