= Wouter Brouwer =

Dutch fencer (1882–1961)

Personal information
- Born: 10 August 1882 Amsterdam, Netherlands
- Died: 4 May 1961 (aged 78) Amsterdam, Netherlands

Sport
- Sport: Fencing

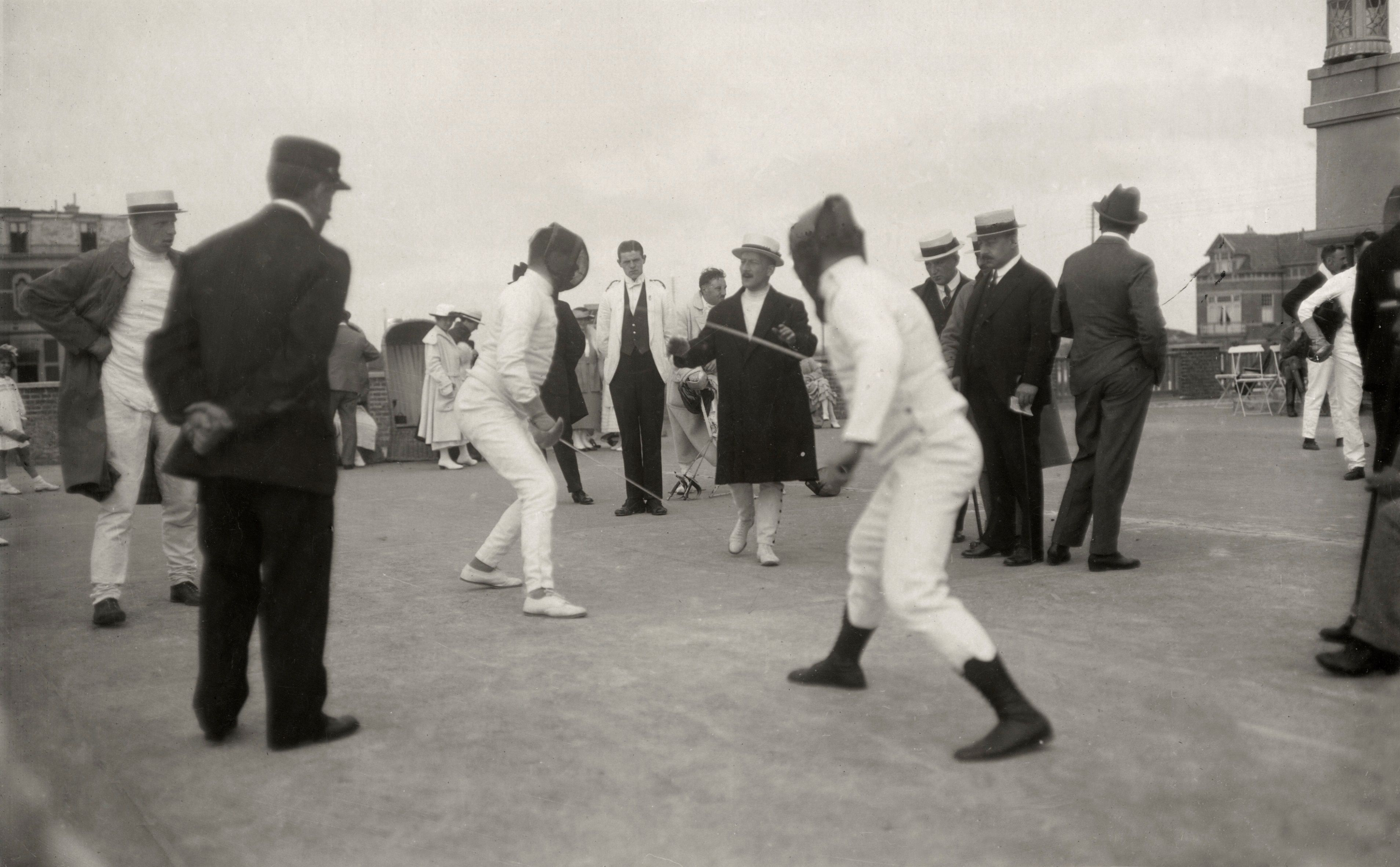

Wouter Brouwer (10 August 1882 – 4 May 1961) was a Dutch fencer. He competed at three Olympic Games.
