= Renzo Compagna =

Italian fencer (1893–1969)

Personal information
- Full name: Lorenzo Agostino Schiavonia Grazia Francesco Catello Antonio Compagna
- Born: 12 August 1893 Castellammare di Stabia, Kingdom of Italy
- Died: 27 November 1969 (aged 76) Rome, Italy

Sport
- Sport: Fencing

Renzo Compagna (12 August 1893 – 27 November 1969) was an Italian fencer. He competed in the individual épée competition at the 1924 Summer Olympics.
