= Krikor Agathon =

Egyptian fencer and shooter

Personal information
- Born: 26 November 1900 Alexandria, Egypt
- Died: c. November 1979 (aged 78–79)

Sport
- Sport: Shooting, fencing

Krikor Agathon (26 November 1900 – c. November 1979) was an Egyptian sport shooter and épée fencer. He competed at two Olympic Games. He later worked as a sports administrator in Egypt and France, and was awarded with the Legion of Honour.
