= Joseph Misrahi =

Egyptian fencer

Personal information
- Nickname: Jack
- Born: 1895
- Died: 1975 (aged 79–80)

Sport
- Country: Egypt
- Sport: Fencing
- Event(s): Foil and epee
- Club: Alexandria Sporting Club

Joseph Misrahi (1895 – 1975) was an Egyptian fencer. He competed at the 1924 Summer Olympics in individual épée and 1928 Summer Olympics in both individual and team foil, and team épée.
