= Konstantinos Nikolopoulos (fencer) =

Greek fencer

Personal information
- Born: 1890
- Died: 1980 (aged 89–90)

Sport
- Sport: Fencing

Konstantinos Nikolopoulos (1890 – 1980) was a Greek fencer. He competed at the 1924 and 1928 Summer Olympics. He was also the mayor of Athens in the early 1950s.
