= Robert Frater (fencer) =

British fencer

Personal information
- Born: 21 July 1885 Narrabri, New South Wales, Australia
- Died: 6 January 1965 (aged 79)

Sport
- Sport: Fencing

Robert Frater (21 July 1885 – 6 January 1965) was a British fencer. He competed in the individual and team épée competitions at the 1924 Summer Olympics.
