= Allen Milner =

American fencer

Personal information
- Born: February 1, 1896 Lafayette, Indiana, United States
- Died: March 11, 1938 (aged 42) Levallois-Perret, Hauts-de-Seine, France

Sport
- Sport: Fencing

Allen Milner (February 1, 1896 – March 11, 1938) was an American épée fencer. He competed at the 1924 and 1928 Summer Olympics.
