= Osvaldo Miranda (fencer) =

Cuban fencer (born 1887)

Personal information
- Born: 1887 Havana, Cuba
- Died: Unknown

Sport
- Sport: Fencing

Osvaldo Miranda (born 1887, date of death unknown) was a Cuban fencer. He competed in the team épée competition at the 1924 Summer Olympics.
