= Peter Ryefelt =

Danish fencer

Personal information
- Born: 8 September 1893 Dragsholm, Denmark
- Died: 10 February 1967 (aged 73) Hovedstaden, Denmark

Sport
- Sport: Fencing

Peter Ryefelt (8 September 1893 – 10 February 1967) was a Danish fencer. He competed at two Olympic Games.
