= Miguel Zabalza =

Spanish fencer

Personal information
- Full name: Miguel Zabalza de la Fuente
- Born: 4 June 1896
- Died: 26 September 1925 (aged 29)

Sport
- Sport: Fencing

Miguel Zabalza de la Fuente (4 June 1896 – 26 September 1925) was a Spanish fencer. He competed in the individual and team épée events at the 1924 Summer Olympics. He was killed in action fighting in the Rif War.
