= Constantin Antoniades =

Swiss fencer (1891–1975)

Personal information
- Born: 24 July 1891 İzmir, Turkey
- Died: April 1975

Sport
- Sport: Fencing

Constantin Antoniades (24 July 1891 – April 1975) was a Swiss épée and foil fencer. He competed at the 1924 and 1936 Summer Olympics.
