= Virgilio Mantegazza =

Italian fencer (1889–1928)

Personal information
- Born: 30 January 1889 Milan, Italy
- Died: 3 July 1927 (aged 38)

Sport
- Sport: Fencing
Medal record
Men's fencing
Representing Italy
Olympic Games
Bronze medal – third place	1924 Paris	Épée, team

Virgilio Mantegazza (30 January 1889 – 3 July 1928) was an Italian fencer. He won a bronze medal in the team épée at the 1924 Summer Olympics.
