= Jacob Bergsland =

Norwegian fencer (1890–1974)

Personal information
- Born: 13 August 1890 Oslo, Norway
- Died: 7 September 1974 (aged 84) Oslo, Norway

Sport
- Sport: Fencing

Jacob Bergsland (13 August 1890 – 7 September 1974) was a Norwegian épée and foil fencer. He competed in three event at the 1928 Summer Olympics.
