= Diego García (fencer) =

Spanish fencer

Personal information
- Born: 5 June 1895
- Died: 22 April 1974

Sport
- Sport: Fencing

Diego García (5 June 1895 - 22 April 1974) was a Spanish épée and foil fencer. He competed at the 1924 and 1928 Summer Olympics.
