= Frédéric Fitting =

Swiss fencer (1902–1998)

Personal information
- Born: 12 September 1902 Le Sentier, Switzerland
- Died: 18 October 1998 (aged 96) Lausanne, Switzerland

Sport
- Sport: Fencing

Frédéric Fitting (12 September 1902 – 18 October 1998) was a Swiss épée and foil fencer. He competed in the Summer Olympic Games of 1920, 1924, 1928, and 1936. His brother, Édouard Fitting, and sister, Emma Fitting, were also Olympic fencers.
