= Santos Ferreira =

Uruguayan fencer

Personal information
- Born: 1889
- Died: Unknown

Sport
- Sport: Fencing

Santos Ferreira (born 1889, date of death unknown) was a Uruguayan fencer. He competed in the individual and team épée and team sabre events at the 1924 Summer Olympics.
