= Fox Villa =

Nicaraguan football club

- Full name: Deportivo Fox Villa
- Ground: Estadio Ricardo Morales Avilés; Jinotepe, Nicaragua
- League: Nicaraguan Primera División
Home colours

Fox Villa is a Nicaraguan football team currently playing in the Nicaraguan Primera División. They are based in Jinotepe.

== History ==
The Club won promotion to the second division during the 2012 season for the first time in the club's history. During 2013 Apertura and 2014 Clausura despite failing to win either tournament their strong aggregate record meant they reached a promotion/relegation playoff against San Marcos F.C. for a chance to gain promotion in the Primera Division, which they won 2-0 making their first appearance in the Primera Division. Fox Villa's first appearance in the Primera Division was an unhappy experience as they lost all 18 games and became the first team in Nicaraguan history to do this.

== Current squad ==
Note: Flags indicate national team as defined under FIFA eligibility rules; some limited exceptions apply. Players may hold more than one non-FIFA nationality.

No.	Pos.	Nation	Player
1	GK	(Nicaragua) NCA	Wilmer Narváez
2	DF	(Nicaragua) NCA	Juan Carlos Vega
3	DF	(Nicaragua) NCA	Pablo Dávila
4	DF	(Nicaragua) NCA	Denis Laguna
5	DF	(Nicaragua) NCA	Wilmer Narváez
6	DF	(Nicaragua) NCA	Victor Centeno
7		(Nicaragua) NCA	José Antonio García
8	DF	(Nicaragua) NCA	Javier Obando
9	DF	(Nicaragua) NCA	Leonel Sequeira
10		(Nicaragua) NCA	Pedro Esteban
11	MF	(Nicaragua) NCA	Raul Narváez
12	MF	(Nicaragua) NCA	Evert Gonzáles

No.	Pos.	Nation	Player
13		(Nicaragua) NCA	Luis Alberto García
14	MF	(Nicaragua) NCA	Erick Lara
15	MF	(Nicaragua) NCA	Moisés Ramírez
16		(Nicaragua) NCA	Wilker Gutiérrez
17		(Nicaragua) NCA	Roberto Mejía Rocha
18	FW	(Nicaragua) NCA	Denis Estrada
19	FW	(Nicaragua) NCA	Axel Silva
20	MF	(Nicaragua) NCA	José Luis García
21	FW	(Honduras) HON	Marvin Lambert Avila
22	FW	(Nicaragua) NCA	René Ruiz
23	DF	(Nicaragua) NCA	Ulises Serrano
24	FW	(Nicaragua) NCA	Carlos Lanuza

== List of coaches ==
- (Nicaragua) Mario Aburto Alegría (2014–2015)
