= Henri Jacquet =

Swiss fencer

Personal information
- Born: 25 June 1888 Geneva, Switzerland
- Died: 18 June 1971 (aged 82) Geneva, Switzerland

Sport
- Sport: Fencing

Henri Jacquet (25 June 1888 – 18 June 1971) was a Swiss épée fencer. He competed at the 1920, 1924 and 1928 Summer Olympics.
