= Mohamed Madkour =

Egyptian cyclist

Personal information
- Full name: Mohamed Madkour

Cycling career
- Sport: Cycling

Mohamed Madkour was an Egyptian cyclist. He competed in two events at the 1924 Summer Olympics.
