= César Miguel =

Spanish fencer

Personal information
- Born: 4 August 1892
- Died: 10 August 1974 (aged 82)

Sport
- Sport: Fencing

César Miguel (4 August 1892 – 10 August 1974) was a Spanish fencer. He competed in the individual épée event at the 1924 Summer Olympics.
