= Frithjof Lorentzen =

Norwegian fencer (1896–1965)

Personal information
- Born: 7 September 1896 Newcastle, New South Wales, Australia
- Died: 13 July 1965 (aged 68) Sandefjord, Norway

Sport
- Sport: Fencing

Frithjof Lorentzen (7 September 1896 – 13 July 1965) was a Norwegian épée and foil fencer. He competed at the 1924 and 1928 Summer Olympics.
