= Salvador Quesada =

Cuban fencer

Personal information
- Born: 3 August 1886 Manzanillo, Cuba
- Died: 24 November 1971 (aged 85)

Sport
- Sport: Fencing

Salvador Quesada (3 August 1886 – 24 November 1971) was a Cuban fencer. He competed in the individual and team épée competitions at the 1924 Summer Olympics.
