= Conrado Rolando =

Uruguayan fencer

Personal information
- Born: 9 August 1904 Montevideo, Uruguay
- Died: 17 June 1970 (aged 65)

Sport
- Sport: Fencing

Conrado Rolando (9 August 1904 – 17 June 1970) was a Uruguayan fencer. He competed in the individual and team épée and sabre events at the 1924 Summer Olympics.
