= Domingo Mendy =

Uruguayan fencer

Personal information
- Born: 31 August 1870
- Died: 19 December 1957 (aged 87)

Sport
- Sport: Fencing

Domingo Mendy (31 August 1870 – 19 December 1957) was a Uruguayan épée, foil and sabre fencer. He competed in five events at the 1924 Summer Olympics.
