= Héctor Belo Herrera =

Uruguayan fencer

Personal information
- Born: 6 May 1905 Montevideo, Uruguay
- Died: 3 March 1936 (aged 30) Montevideo, Uruguay

Sport
- Sport: Fencing

Héctor Belo Herrera (6 May 1905 – 3 March 1936) was a Uruguayan fencer. He competed in the individual and team sabre and épée events at the 1924 Summer Olympics.
