= Arthur Lyon (fencer) =

American fencer

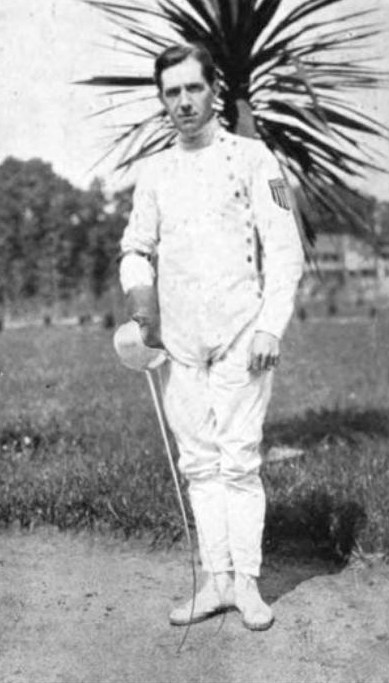

Personal information
- Full name: Arthur St. Clair Lyon
- Born: August 1, 1876 New York, New York, United States
- Died: June 13, 1952 (aged 75) Santa Monica, California, United States

Sport
- Sport: Fencing
Medal record
Men's fencing
Representing United States
Olympic Games
Bronze medal – third place	1920 Antwerp	Foil, team

Arthur St. Clair Lyon (August 1, 1876 – June 13, 1952) was an American fencer. He won a bronze medal in the team foil event at the 1920 Summer Olympics.

He died at Saint John's Hospital in Santa Monica, California, on June 13, 1952, and was buried at Warwick Cemetery in Warwick, New York.
