= Wenceslao Paunero (fencer) =

Argentine fencer

Personal information
- Born: 23 February 1887 Buenos Aires, Argentina
- Died: 12 March 1937 (aged 50) Mar del Plata, Argentina

Sport
- Sport: Fencing

Wenceslao Paunero (23 February 1887 – 12 March 1937) was an Argentine fencer. He competed in the individual and team épée competitions at the 1924 Summer Olympics.
