= Pieter van Boven =

Dutch fencer (1898–1952)

Personal information
- Born: 10 June 1898 Odoorn, Netherlands
- Died: 18 June 1952 (aged 54) The Hague, Netherlands

Sport
- Sport: Fencing

Pieter van Boven (10 June 1898 – 18 June 1952) was a Dutch fencer. He competed in the individual and team épée events at the 1924 Summer Olympics.
