= Nils Hellsten (fencer) =

Swedish fencer

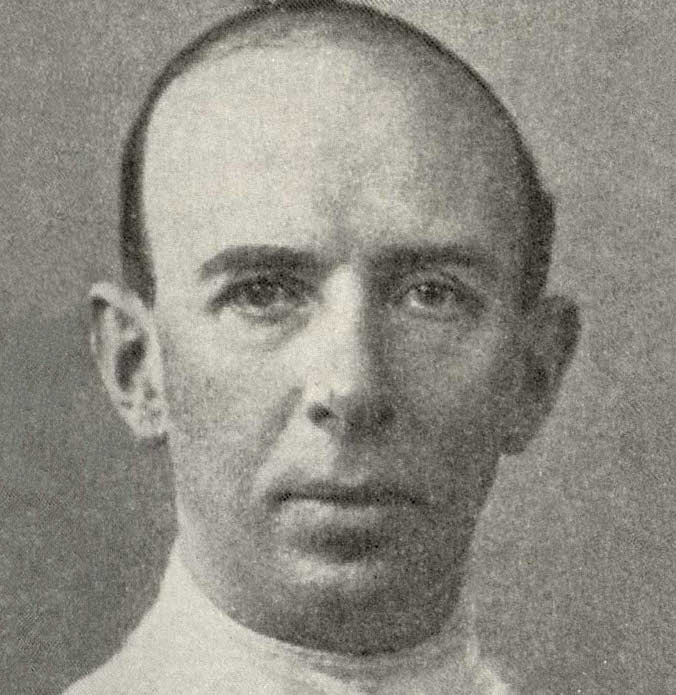

Personal information
- Born: 19 February 1886 Stockholm, Sweden
- Died: 12 April 1962 (aged 76) Stockholm, Sweden

Sport
- Sport: Fencing
- Club: FFF, Stockholm
Medal record
Representing Sweden
Olympic Games
Bronze medal – third place	1924 Paris	Épée, ind.
World Fencing Championships
Bronze medal – third place	1931 Vienna	Épée, team
Bronze medal – third place	1934 Warsaw	Épée, team

Nils Erik Hellsten (19 February 1886 – 12 April 1962) was a Swedish fencer who competed at the 1920, 1924 and 1928 Olympics. He won a bronze medal in the individual épée in 1924 and placed fifth in 1928. In 1920, he also took part in the individual foil contest. At the world championships, he took two bronze medals in the team épée in 1931 and 1934.

Hellsten was a military officer, a major in reserves. He was a teacher and deputy head at the Swedish School of Sport and Health Sciences. He is not related to the Olympic gymnast Nils Hellsten.
