= Raoul Heide =

Norwegian fencer

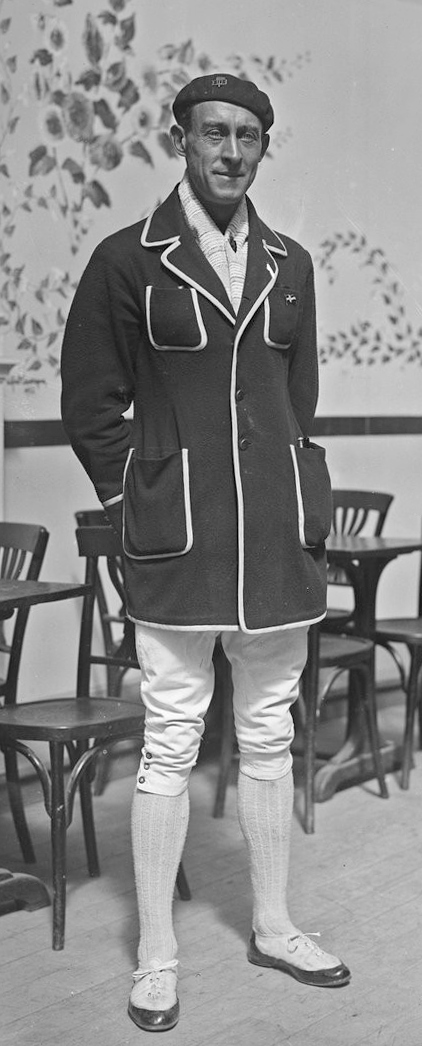
- Raoul Heide at the 1922 European Championships

Personal information
- Born: 13 October 1888 Paris, France
- Died: 21 February 1978 (aged 89)

Sport
- Sport: Fencing
- Club: Oslo Fekteklub

Raoul Heide (13 October 1888 – 21 February 1978) was a Norwegian fencer. He competed in the team and individual épée events at the 1924 and 1928 Summer Olympics.
