= Johan Falkenberg =

Norwegian fencer (1901–1963)

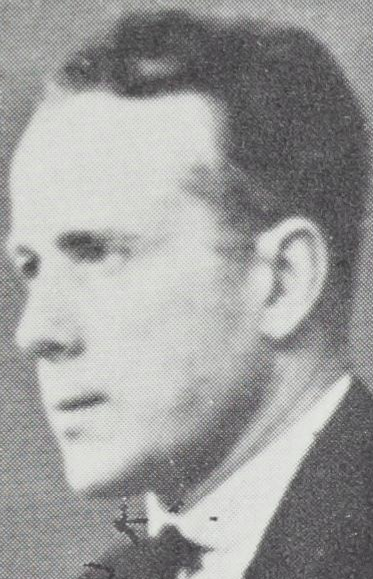
- student catalogue, published 1950

Personal information
- Born: 8 October 1901 Oslo, Norway
- Died: 13 July 1963 (aged 61) Oslo, Norway

Sport
- Sport: Fencing

Johan Christian Falkenberg (8 October 1901 – 12 July 1963) was a Norwegian épée and foil fencer. He competed at three Olympic Games.

During the Second World War, Falkenberg was a member of the Norwegian resistance movement, leading Milorg districts 22, 23, 40 and 41 from 1943 onwards. For his service, Falkenberg was awarded the Defence Medal 1940–1945, as well as French and British decorations.
