= Ramíro Mañalich =

Cuban fencer

Personal information
- Born: 7 March 1887 Havana, Cuba
- Died: Unknown

Sport
- Sport: Fencing

Ramíro Mañalich (born 7 March 1887) was a Cuban fencer. He competed in the individual and team épée competitions at the 1924 Summer Olympics.
