= Sigurd Akre-Aas =

Norwegian fencer (1897–1968)

Personal information
- Born: 12 June 1897 Ytre Rendal, Hedmark, Norway
- Died: 18 June 1968 (aged 71) Asker, Norway

Sport
- Sport: Fencing

Sigurd Akre-Aas (12 June 1897 – 18 June 1968) was a Norwegian fencer. He competed at the 1924 and 1928 Summer Olympics.

He also won the national championships in the 1920s – most of them with the sabre (1922, 1923, 1925, 1926 and 1928). In his private life, he was an engineer specialising in refrigerator systems. He survived the war years as an inventor of small household appliances. The company he started in 1946 still exists. A bronze statue was unveiled of him at the 2019 Veidemann Festival in Åkrestrømmen culture park in Rendalen Municipality.
