= Eduardo Alonso =

Cuban fencer

Personal information
- Born: 2 January 1899 Havana, Cuba

Sport
- Sport: Fencing

Eduardo Alonso (born 2 January 1899, date of death unknown) was a Cuban fencer. He competed in the individual and team épée competitions at the 1924 Summer Olympics.
