= List of Austrian sportspeople =

== Fencing ==
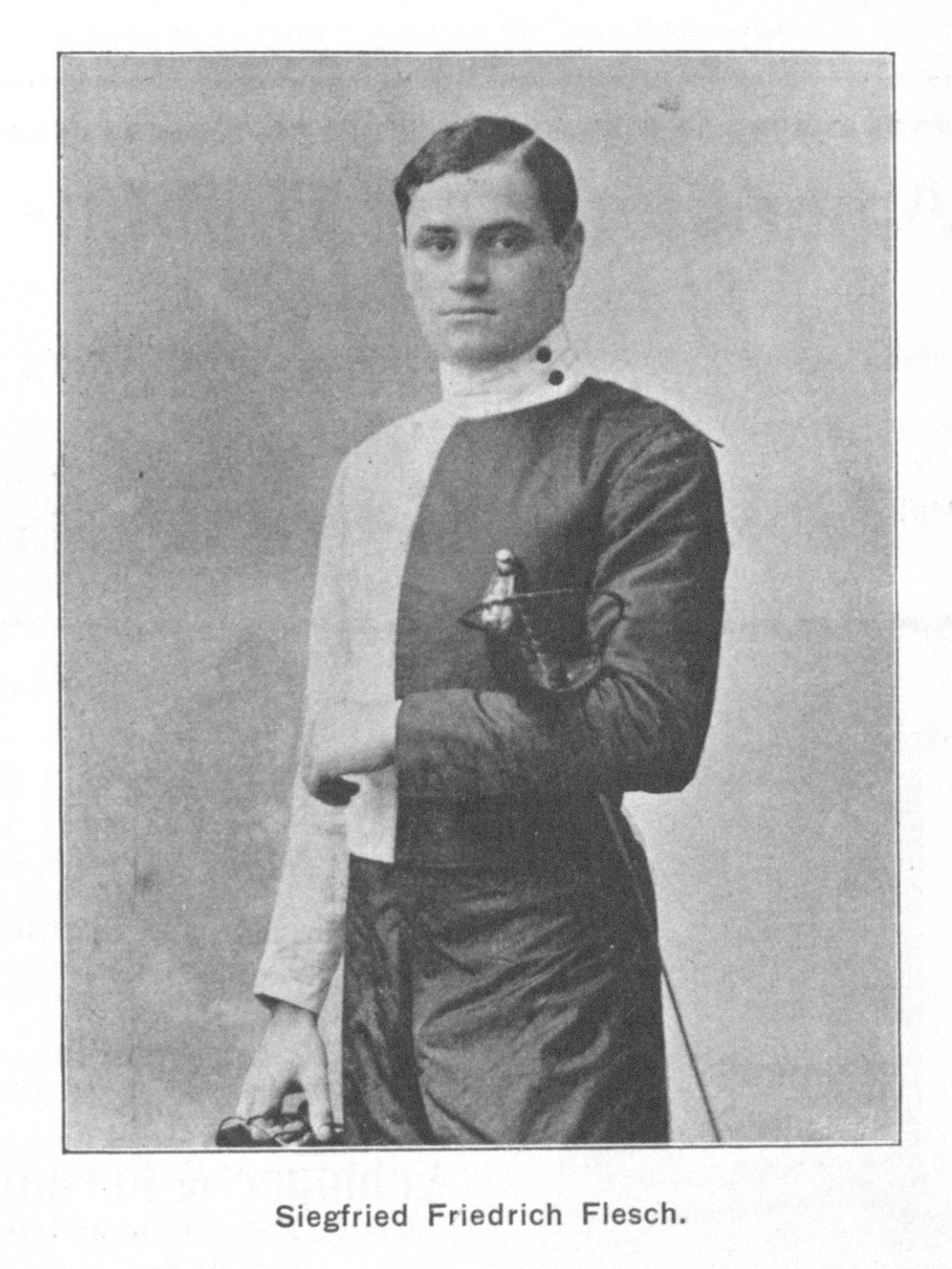
Siegfried "Fritz" Flesch

- Albert Bogen (Albert Bógathy) (1882–1961), saber fencer, Olympic silver
- Siegfried "Fritz" Flesch (1872–1939), sabre fencer, Olympic bronze
- Dr. Otto Herschmann (1877–1942), saber fencer, Olympic silver; 100-m freestyle in swimming, Olympic silver
- Ellen Preis (1912–2007), foil fencer, 3-time world champion (1947, 1949, and 1950), Olympic champion, 17-time Austrian champion

== Formula One ==
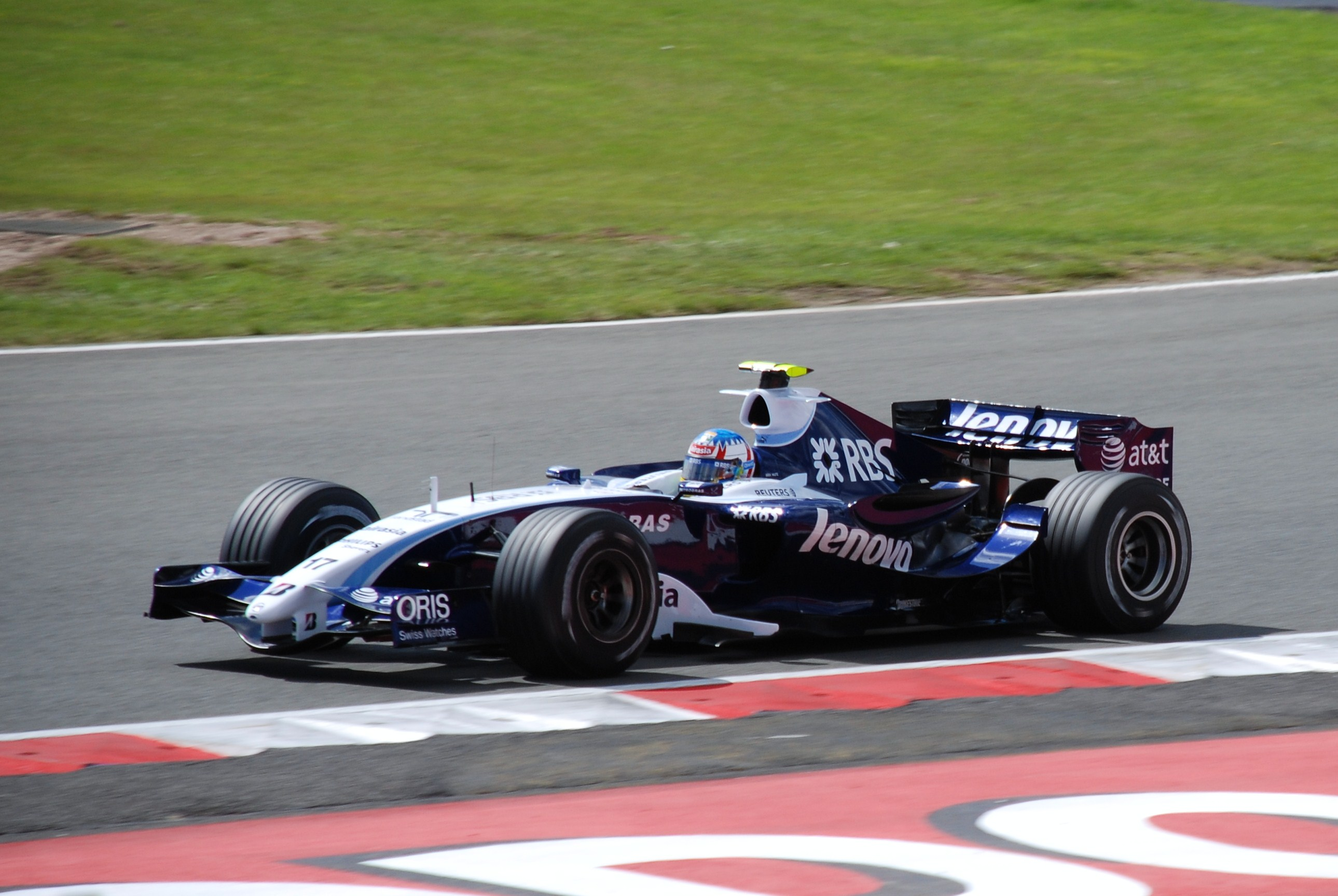
Alexander Wurz at the 2007 British Grand Prix

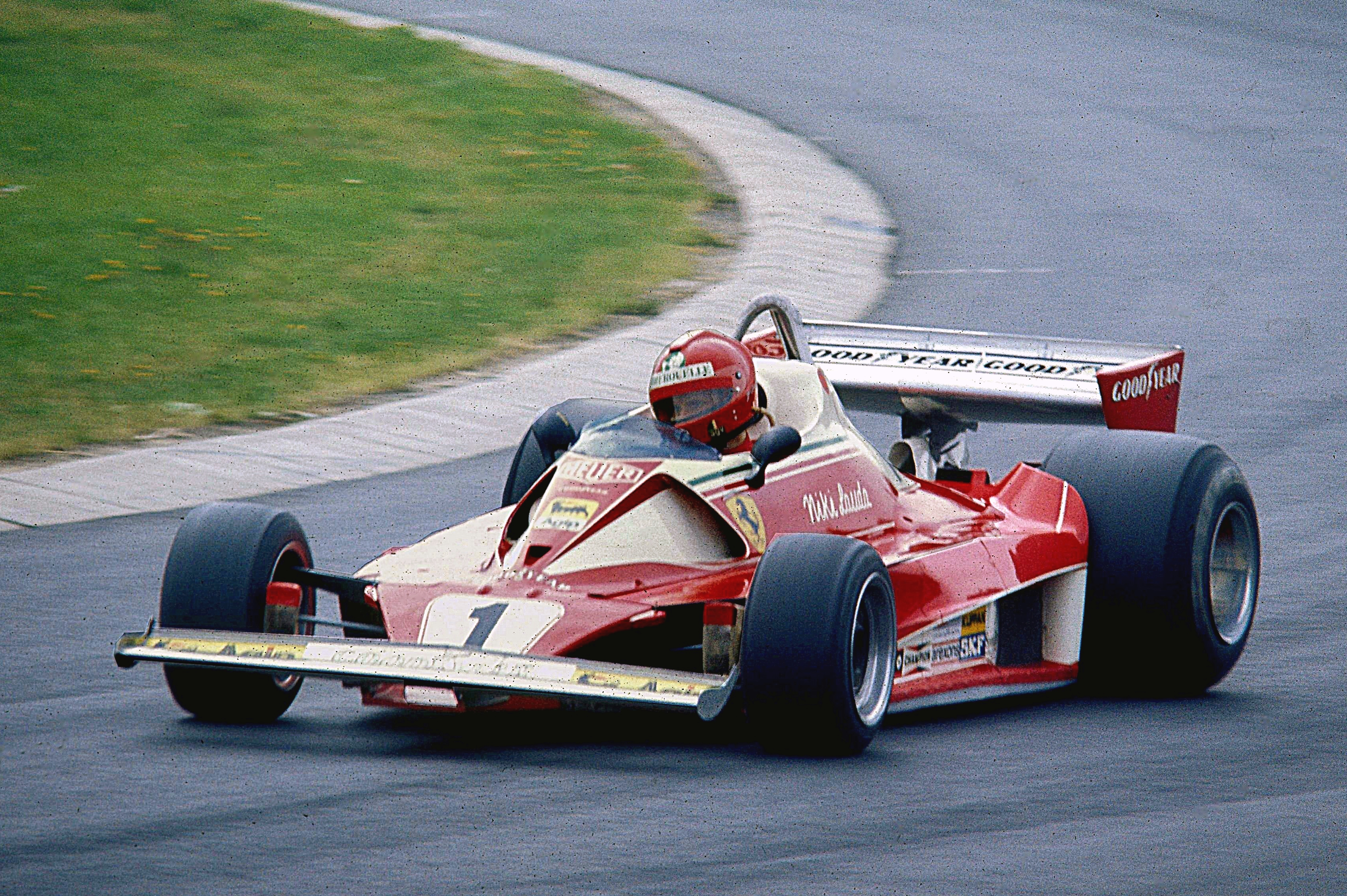
Niki Lauda in 1976

Austria has produced two Formula One champions, Jochen Rindt and Niki Lauda. The following is a list of drivers.

- Gerhard Berger (1959–)
- Harald Ertl (1948–1982), Died in 1982 due to an aircraft accident
- Patrick Friesacher (1980–), Drove for Minardi in 2005, scoring three points in the infamous 2005 United States Grand Prix
- Christian Klien (1983–), Drove for Red Bull Racing and HRT in F1.
- Niki Lauda (1949–2019), three time Formula one world champion
- Helmut Marko (1943–), former driver and current advisor to Red Bull Racing
- Roland Ratzenberger (1960–1994), died in 1994 due to race related accident
- Jochen Rindt (1942–1970), Formula one world champion, died in 1970 due to race related accident
- Karl Wendlinger (1968–), currently driving in the FIA GT Championship
- Toto Wolff (1972–), motorsport executive, currently team principle of Mercedes-Benz
- Alexander Wurz (1974–), currently driving for Honda (as a test driver)

== Football ==
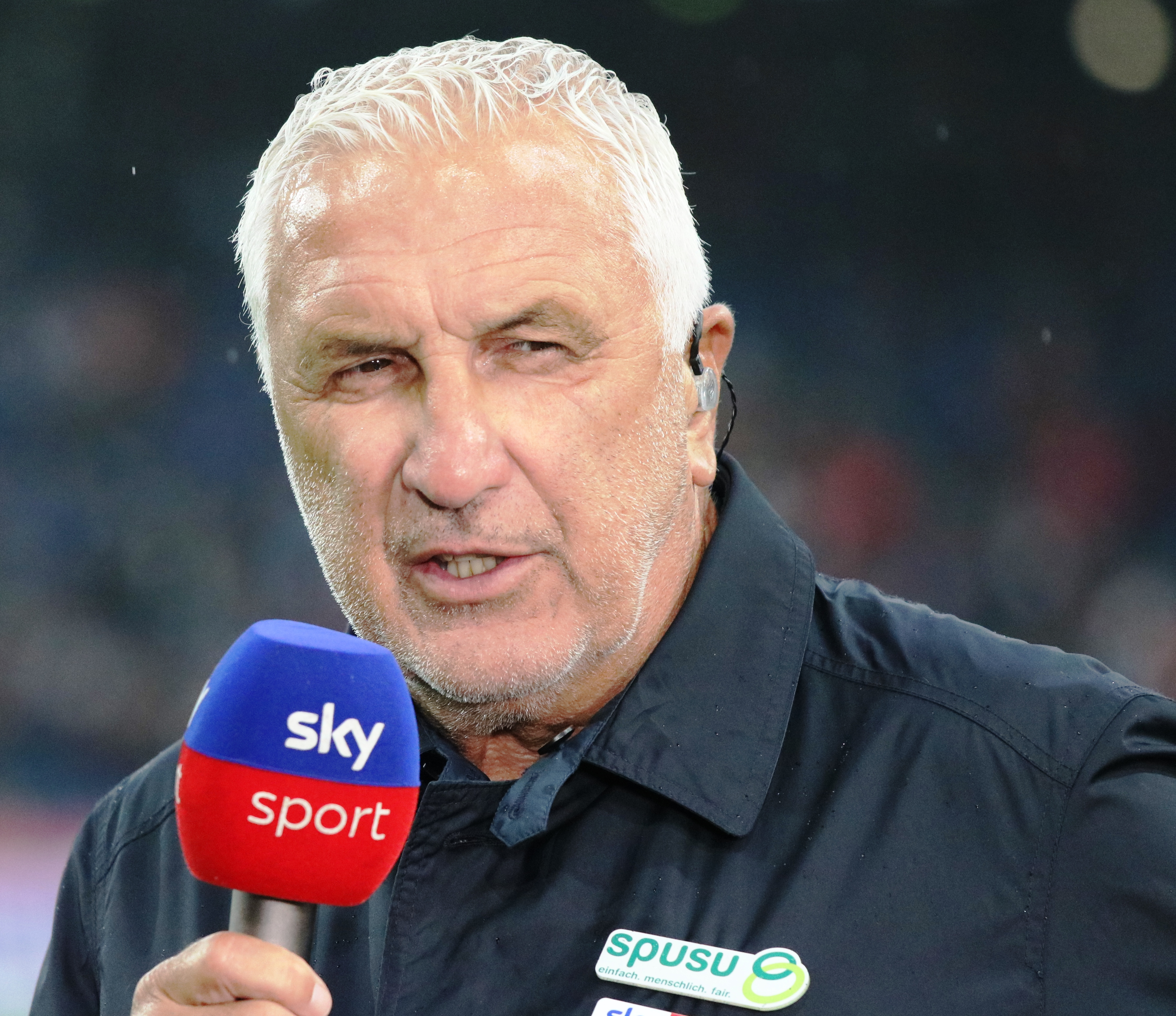
Hans Krankl

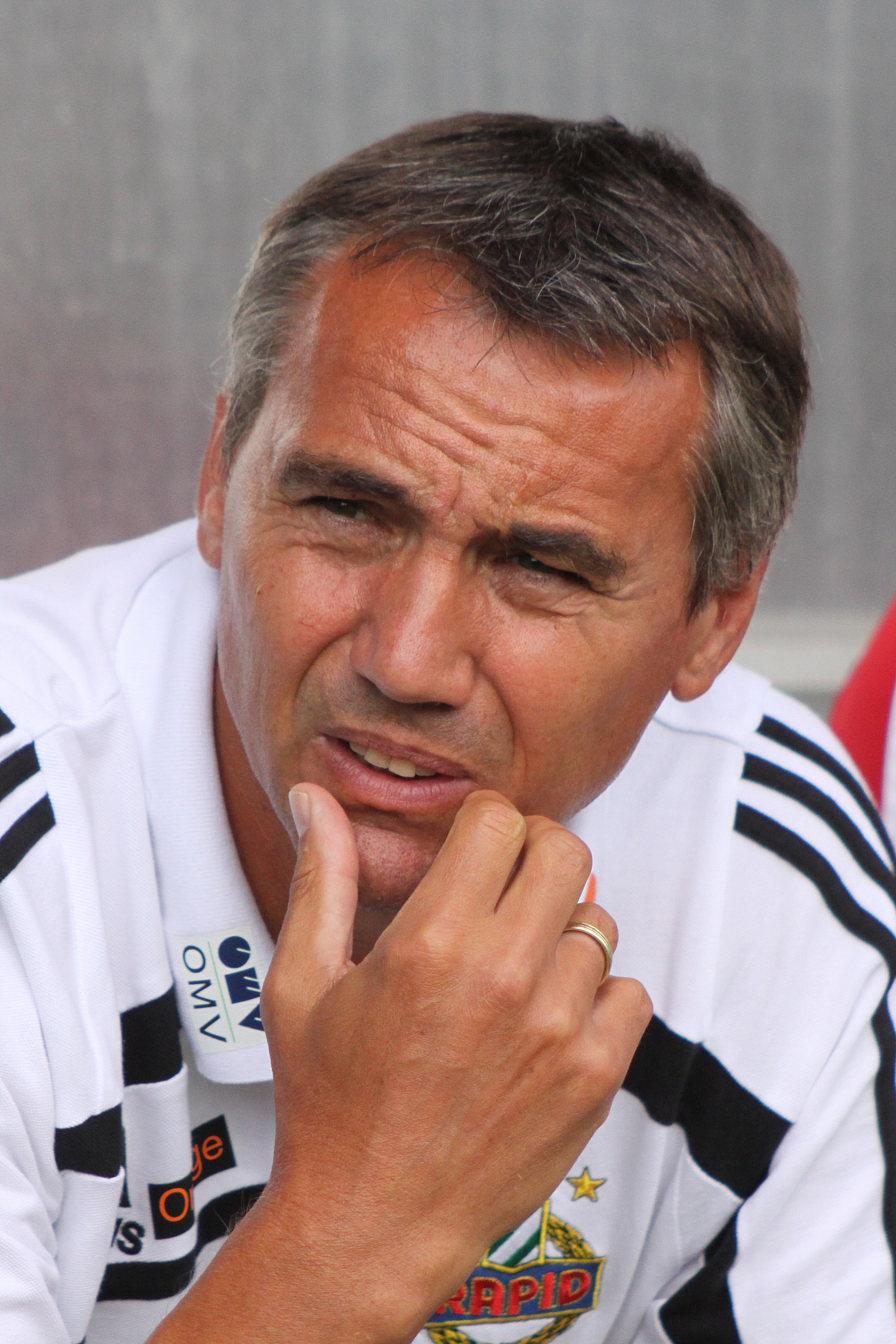
Peter Pacult

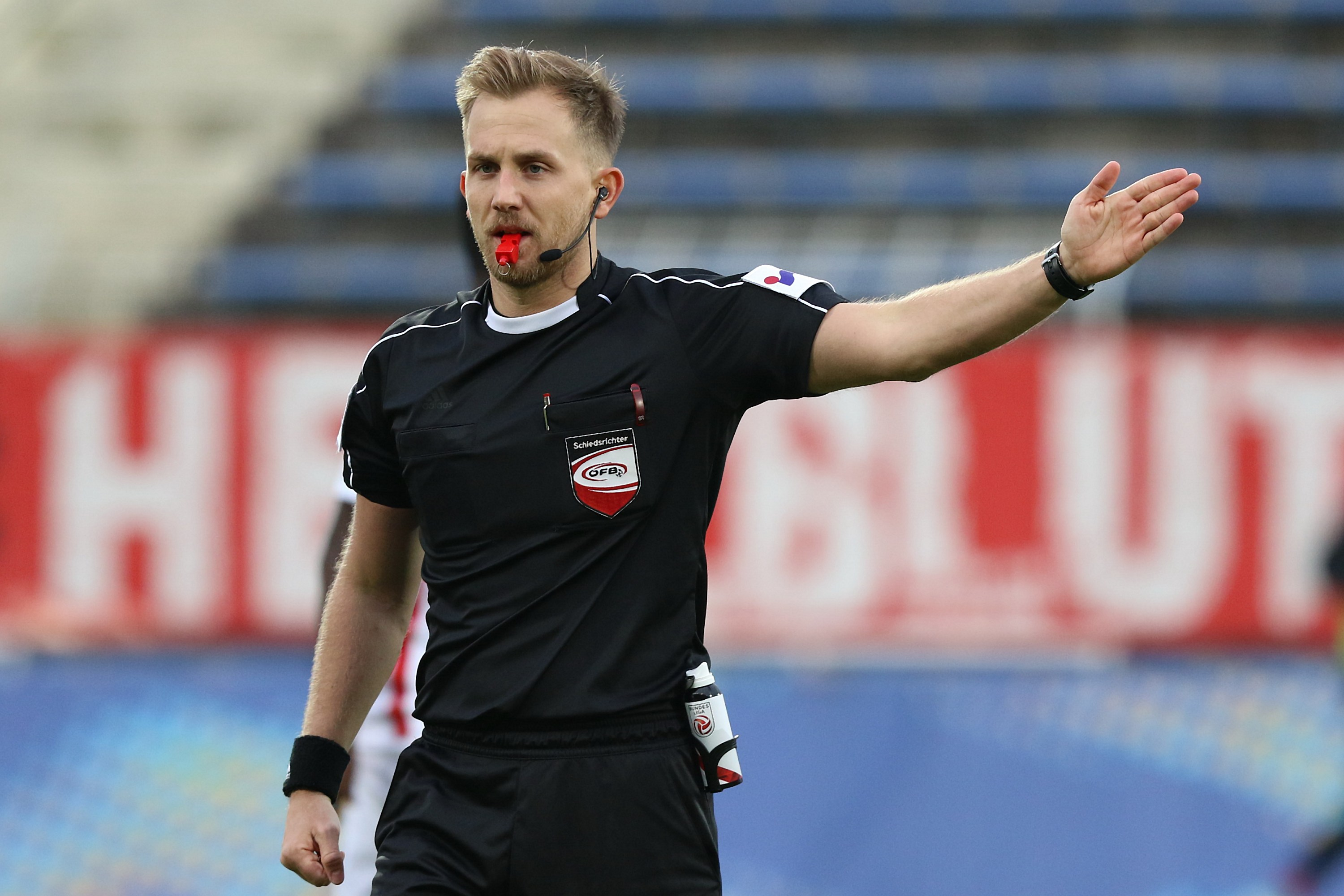
Julian Weinberger

The Bundesliga is Austria's professional football league.

- David Alaba (1992–) – defender
- Marko Arnautović (1989–) – player
- Stefan Bliem (1983–) – goalkeeper
- Fritz Dünmann (1884–1942) – striker
- Otto Fischer (1901–1941), left winger and coach
- Toni Fritsch (1945–2005), former Austrian football player and former placekicker for several National Football League teams (American football)
- Andreas Herzog (1968–) – footballer and manager
- Josef Hickersberger (1948–), football player and coach
- Veli Kavlak (1988–) – player
- Hans Krankl (1953–), footballer and coach
- Božo Kovačević (1979–)
- Peter Pacult
- Yasin Pehlivan (1989–) – midfielder
- Emanuel Pogatetz (1983–)
- Toni Polster (1964–)
- Herbert Prohaska (1955–)
- Helmut Riegler (1976–)
- Harald Ruckendorfer (1982–)
- Paul Scharner (1980–) – player
- Max Scheuer (1895–1941), defender; national team
- Heinrich Schönfeld (1900 – 1976), forward and manager
- Matthias Sindelar (1903–1939), nicknamed "the Mozart of football", Voted the greatest Austrian football player of all time.
- Julian Weinberger (1985–) – FIFA referee

== Hockey ==
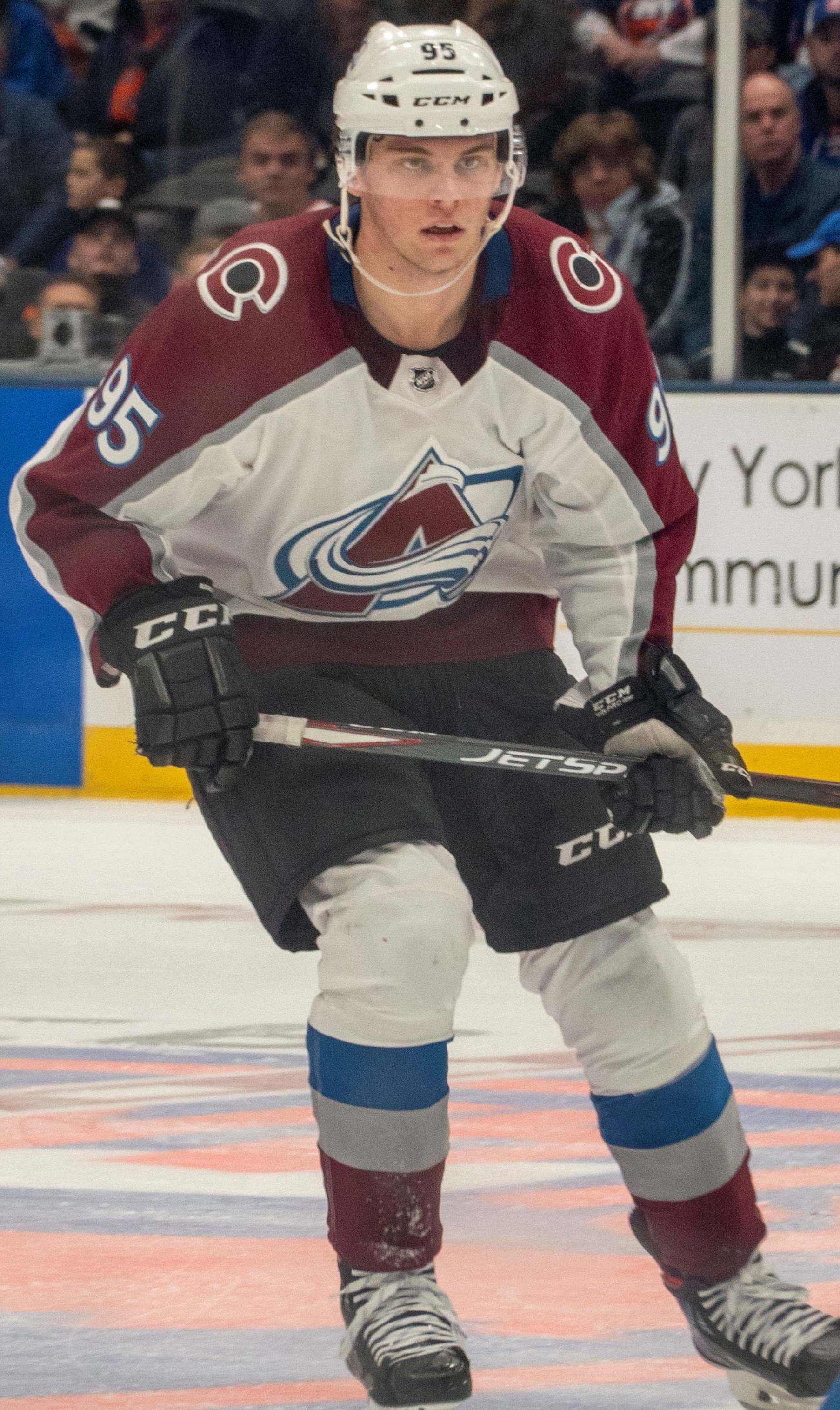
André Burakovsky

- Christoph Brandner, NHL hockey player
- André Burakovsky, Austria-born Swedish, left wing (Colorado Avalanche)
- Robert Burakovsky, Sweden, right wing (NHL)
- Reinhard Divis, NHL hockey player
- Hans Dobida, inductee into the IIHF Hall of Fame
- Michael Grabner
- Thomas Vanek, NHL hockey player
- Walter Wasservogel, inductee into the IIHF Hall of Fame

== Mountaineering ==
- Karl Blodig, first to climb all alpine mountains above 4000m
- Hermann Buhl, first ascent of Nanga Parbat (1953), first ascent of Broad Peak (1957)
- Kurt Diemberger, first ascents of Broad Peak (1957) and Dhaulagiri (1960)
- Peter Habeler, first ascent of Mount Everest without oxygen (together with Reinhold Messner)
- Heinrich Harrer, first ascent of the Carstensz Pyramid
- Fritz Moravec, first ascent of Gasherbrum II together with Josef Larch and Hans Willenpart
- Ludwig Purtscheller, first ascent of Kilimanjaro (1889)
- Marcus Schmuck, first ascent of Broad Peak (1957), initiator and leader of the OEAV Karakoram Expedition
- Herbert Tichy, first ascent of Cho Oyu
- Fritz Wintersteller, first ascent of Broad Peak (1957)

== Sailing ==
- Andreas Geritzer, sailor
- Roman Hagara, sailor (Olympic champion 2000 and 2004 with Hans-Peter Steinacher)
- Hans-Peter Steinacher, sailor (Olympic champion 2000 and 2004 with Roman Hagara)

== Skating ==
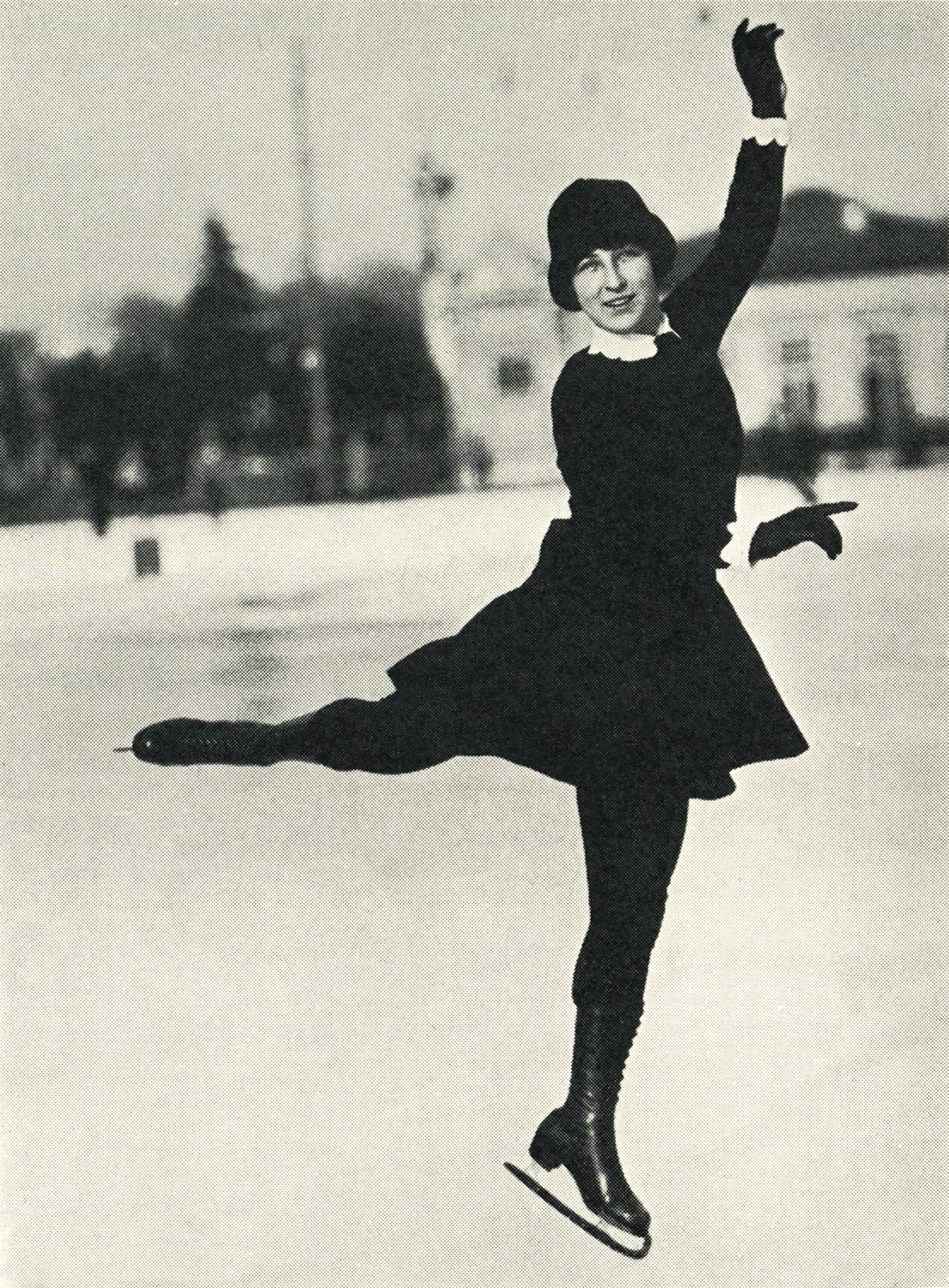
Fritzi Burger

- Fritzi Burger, figure skater, Olympic 2x silver, World Championship 2x silver
- Emese Hunyady, speed skater (Olympic champion 1994)
- Felix Kasper, figure skater, Olympic bronze

== Skiing ==
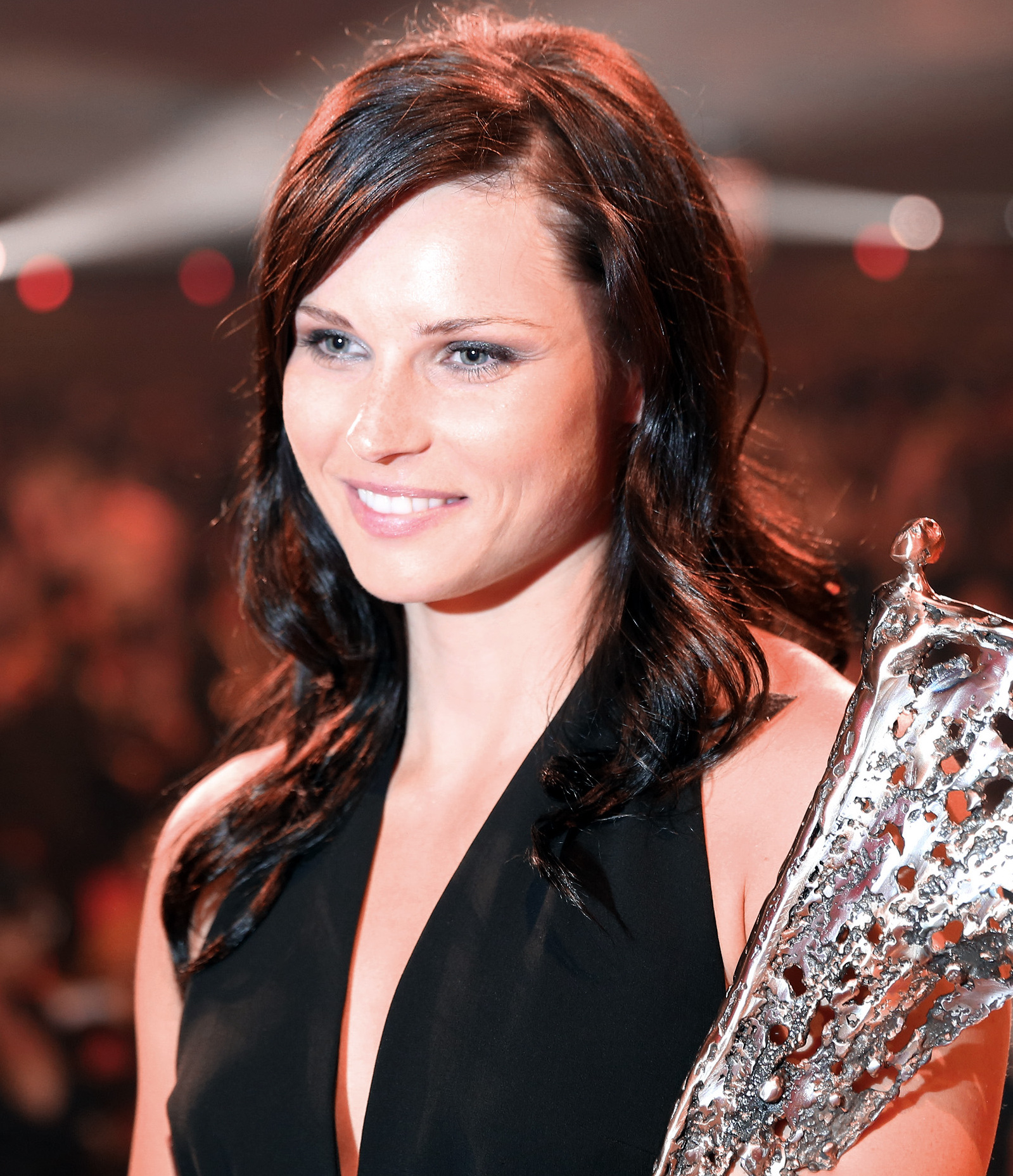
Anna Fenninger

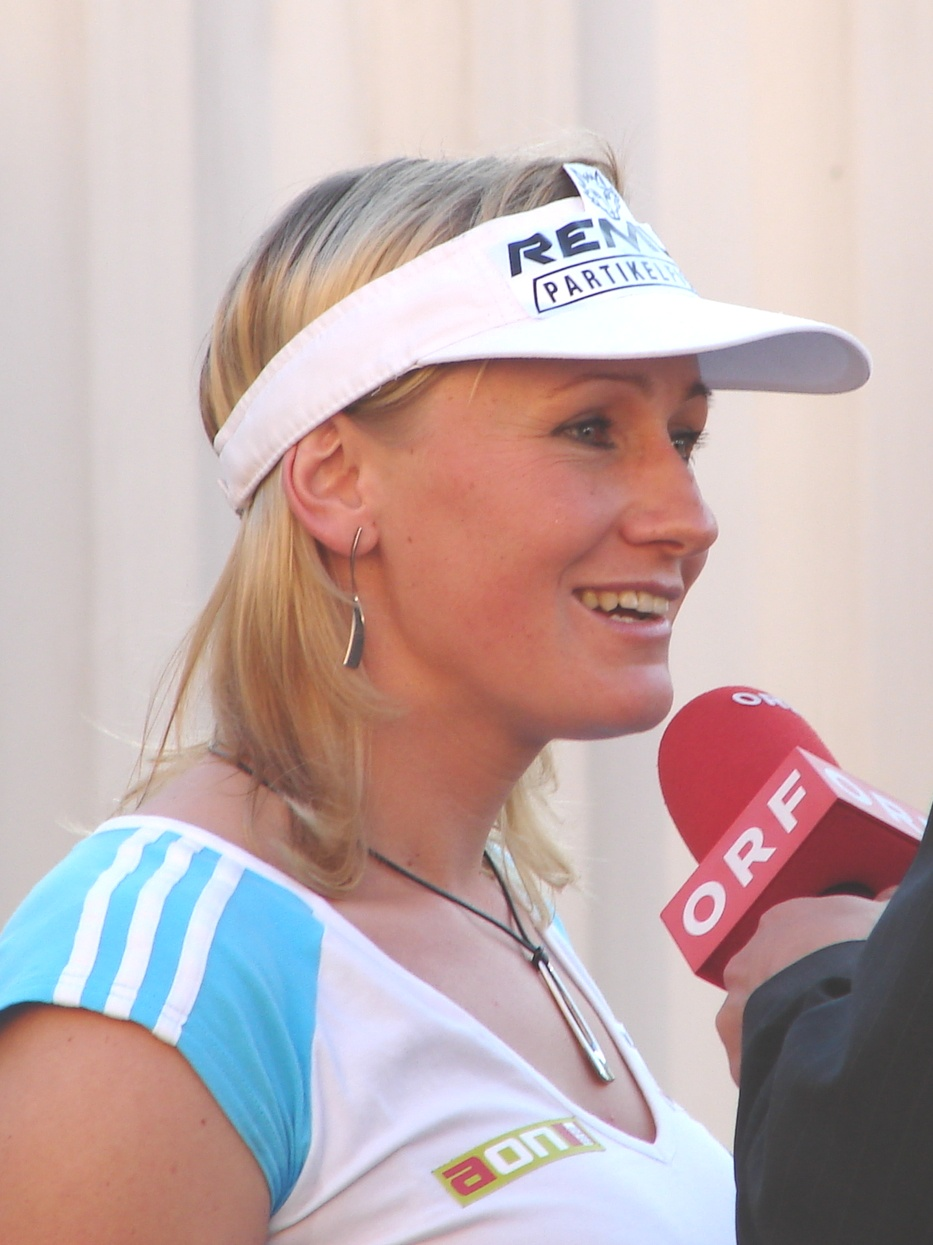
Renate Götschl

- Armin Assinger (1964–)
- Dieter Bartsch (1948–), coach
- Michaela Dorfmeister (1973–), Olympic champion
- Christoph Ebenbichler (1983–)
- Stephan Eberharter (1969–), Olympic champion
- Anna Fenninger (1969–), Olympic champion
- Andreas Goldberger (1972–), ski jumper
- Renate Götschl (1975–)
- Christl Haas (1943–2001)
- Hansi Hinterseer (1954–)
- Marcel Hirscher (1989–)
- Franz Klammer (1953–)
- Stefan Kraft, ski jumper (world record holder)
- Hermann Maier (1972–), Olympic champion
- Ulrike Maier, Olympic champion (1967–1994)
- Annemarie Moser-Pröll (1953–), Olympic champion
- Patrick Ortlieb (1967–), Olympic champion
- Benjamin Raich (1978–), Olympic champion
- Toni Sailer (1935–2009), won all three gold medals, earning the Triple Crown of Alpine Skiing
- Gregor Schlierenzauer, ski jumper
- Karl Schnabl (1954–), ski jumper
- Karl Schranz (1938–)
- Thomas Stangassinger (1965–), Olympic champion
- Hubert Strolz (1962–), Olympic champion
- Ernst Vettori (1964–), ski jumper
- Anita Wachter (1967–), Olympic champion
- Felix Gottwald (1976–), Olympic champion

== Swimming ==
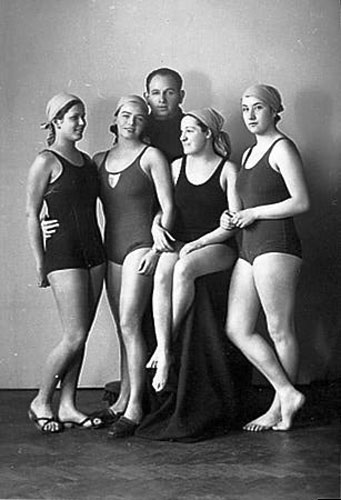
Judith Deutsch, Hedy Bienenfeld, Coach Zsigo Wertheimer, Fritzi Löwy, and Luci Goldner

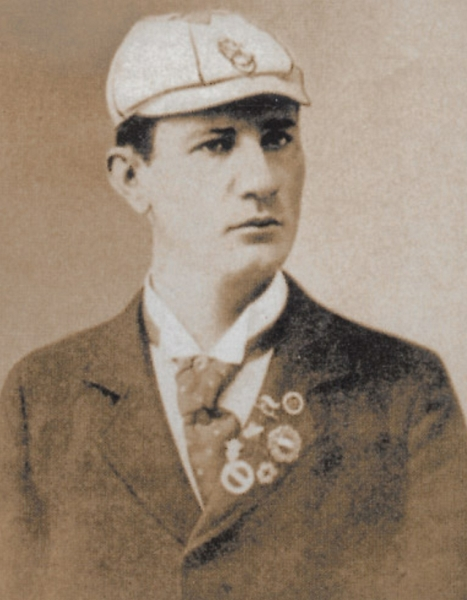
Paul Neumann

- Margarete "Grete" Adler, Olympic bronze (4x100-meter freestyle relay)
- Hedy Bienenfeld (1907–1976), Austrian-American Olympic swimmer
- Alfred Guth (1908–1996), Austrian-born American water polo player, swimmer, and Olympic modern pentathlete
- Judith Haspel (born "Judith Deutsch"), held every Austrian women's middle and long distance freestyle record in 1935
- Otto Herschmann, Olympic silver (100-m freestyle)
- Mirna Jukić, swimmer
- Ruth Langer (1921–1999), Austrian swimmer
- Fritzi Löwy (1910–1994), Olympic swimmer
- Klara Milch, Olympic bronze (4x100-m freestyle relay)
- Paul Neumann, Olympic champion (500-m freestyle)
- Maxim Podoprigora, Olympic swimmer
- Shoshana Ribner, Israeli Olympic swimmer
- Markus Rogan, swimmer
- Otto Scheff (born "Otto Sochaczewsky"), Olympic champion (400-m freestyle) and 2x bronze (400-m freestyle, 1,500-m freestyle)
- Josephine Sticker, Olympic bronze (4x100-m freestyle relay)
- Otto Wahle, 2x Olympic silver (1,000-m freestyle, 200-m obstacle race) and bronze (400-m freestyle); International Swimming Hall of Fame

== Table tennis ==
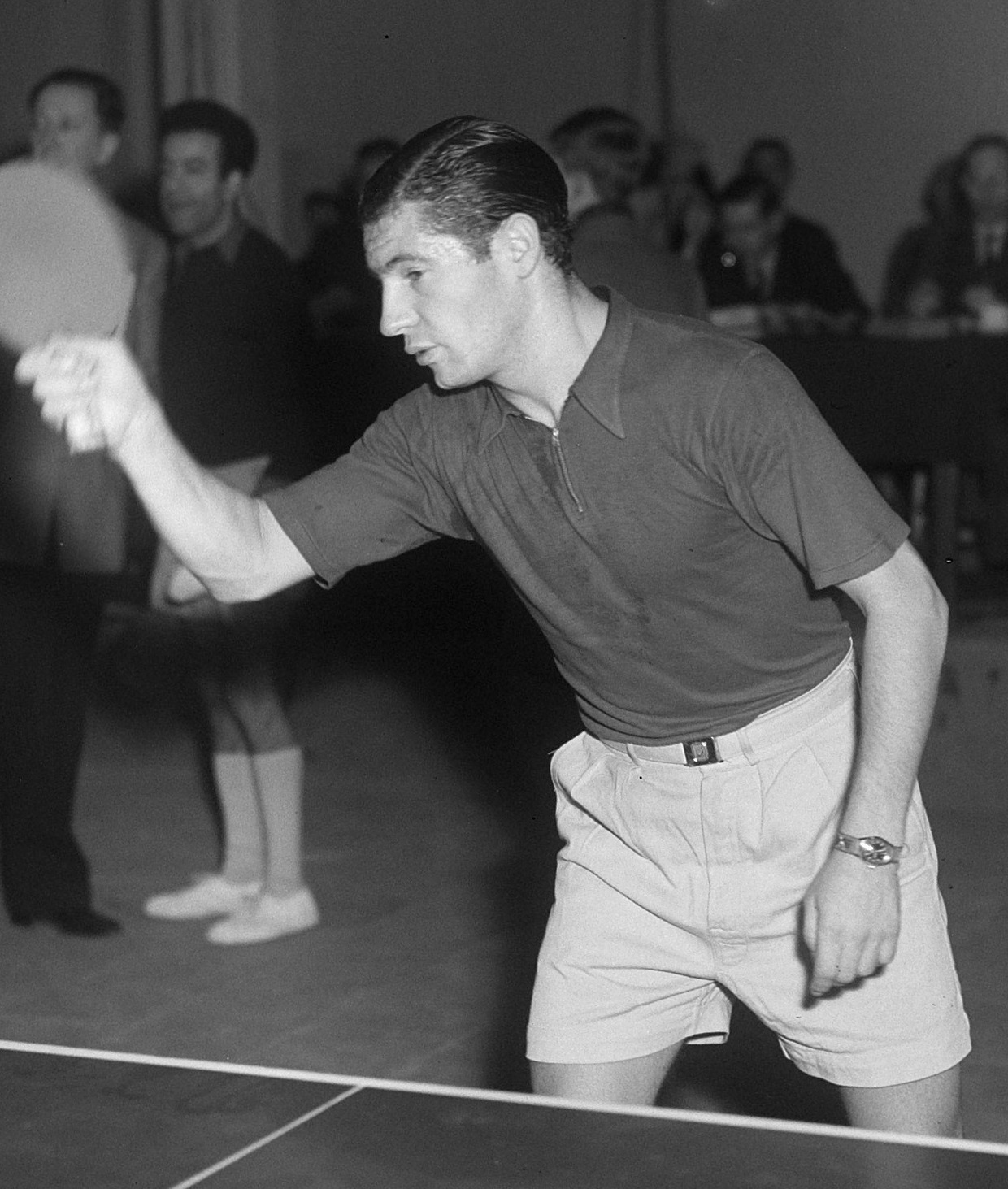
Richard Bergmann

- Richard Bergmann, table tennis, 7-time world champion, Hall of Fame
- Erwin Kohn, table tennis world champion
- Alfred Liebster, table tennis player
- Werner Schlager, table tennis player (world champion 2003)

== Tennis ==
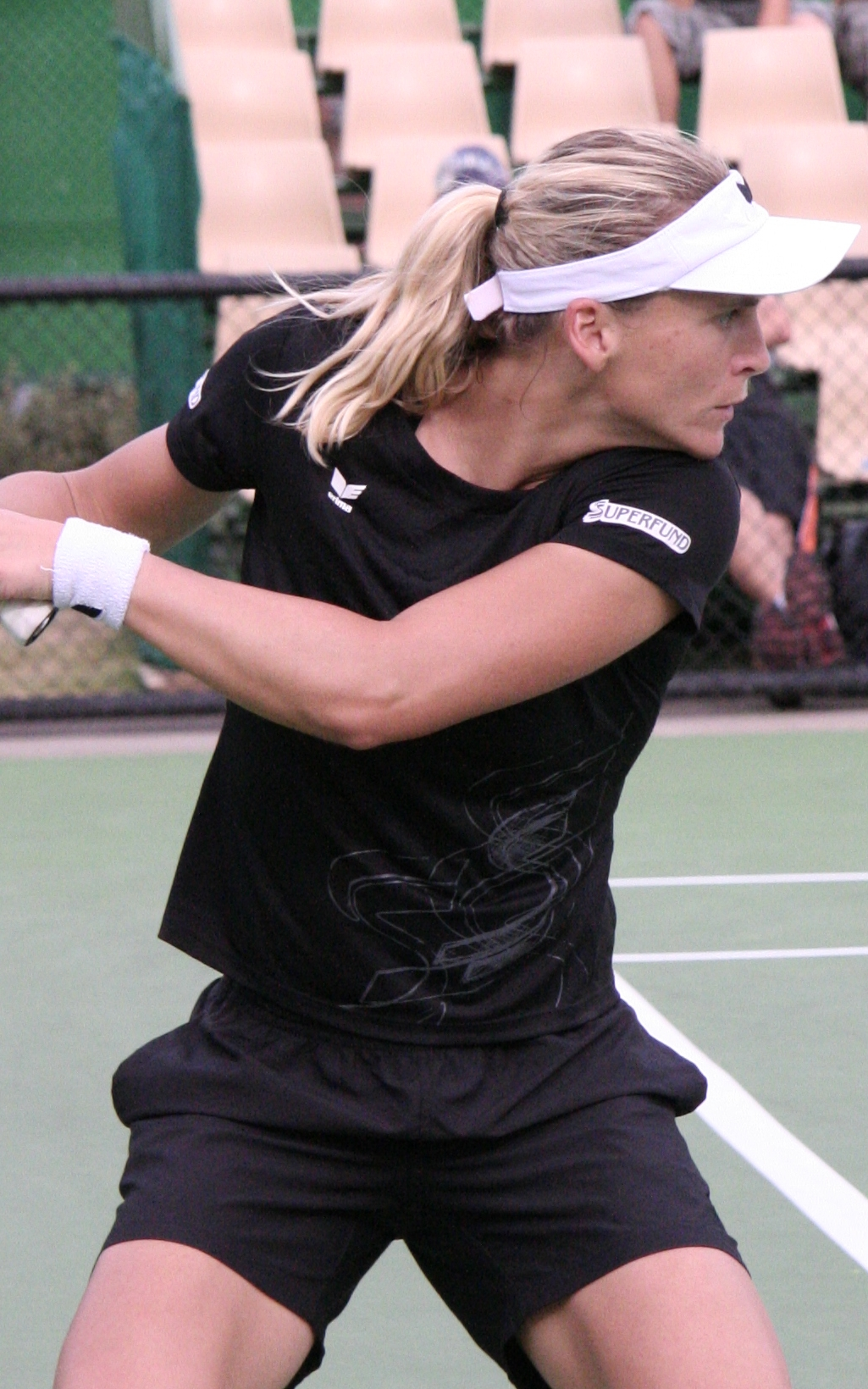
Sybille Bammer

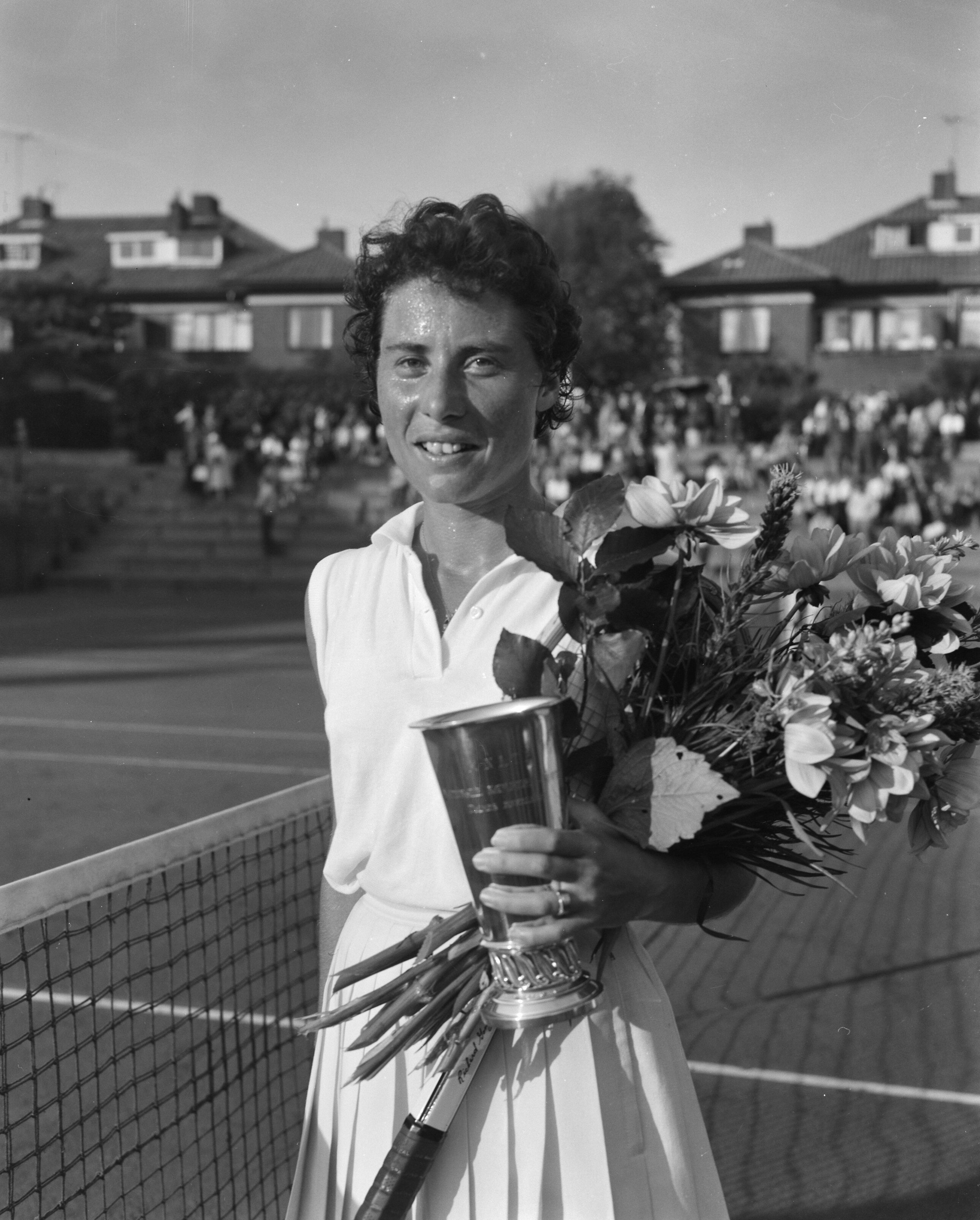
Eva Duldig

- Sybille Bammer (born 1980)
- Eva Duldig (born 1938), Austrian-born Australian and Dutch tennis player, author
- Werner Eschauer
- Nikola Hofmanova
- Melanie Klaffner
- Julian Knowle
- Daniel Köllerer
- Stefan Koubek
- Oliver Marach
- Patricia Mayr
- Jürgen Melzer (born 1981), World No. 8
- Yvonne Meusburger (born 1983)
- Uberto De Morpurgo (1896–1961), Austrian-born Italian tennis player, World No. 8
- Thomas Muster (born 1967), former World No. 1, 1995 French Open Champion
- Tamira Paszek (born 1990)
- Barbara Paulus (born 1970), World No. 10
- Alexander Peya (born 1980)
- Felix Pipes, Olympic silver (doubles)
- Sylvia Plischke
- Barbara Schett (born 1976)
- Dominic Thiem (born 1993), 2020 US Open Champion, World No. 3
- Barbara Schwartz (born 1979)

== Weightlifting ==
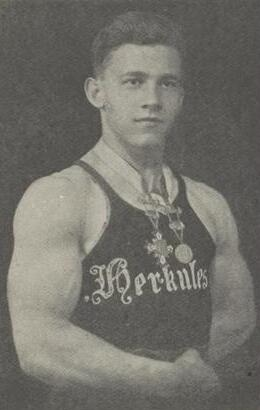
Hans Haas

- Robert Fein (1907–1975), Olympic Champion weightlifter
- Hans Haas (1906–1973), weightlifter, Olympic champion (lightweight), silver
- Mickey Hirschl (1906–1991), weightlifting junior champion

== Wrestling ==
- Mickey Hirschl, wrestler, 2x Olympic bronze (heavyweight freestyle and Greco-Roman)
- Fred Oberlander, wrestler; world champion (freestyle heavyweight)

== Other notables in sport ==
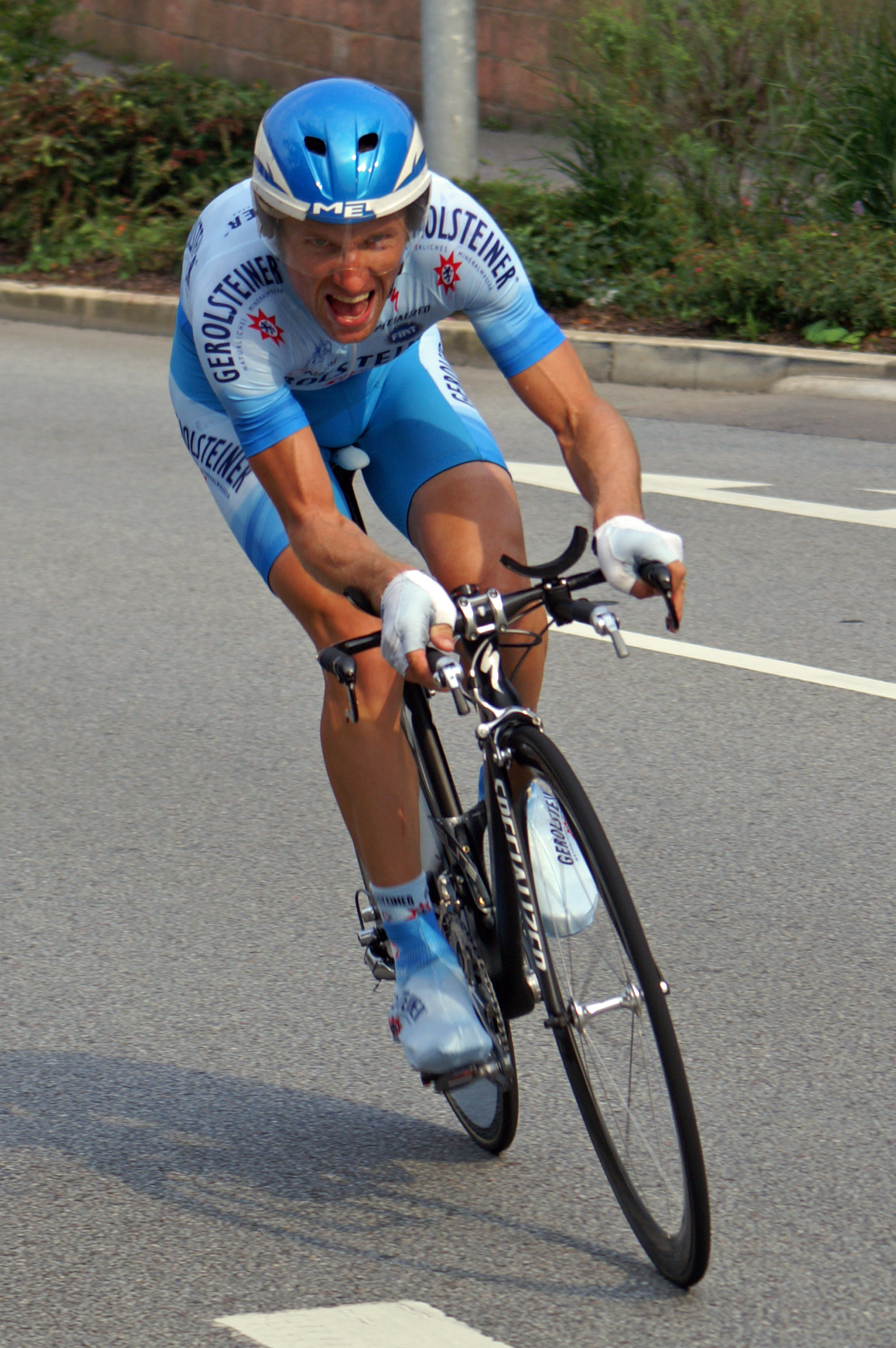
Georg Totschnig

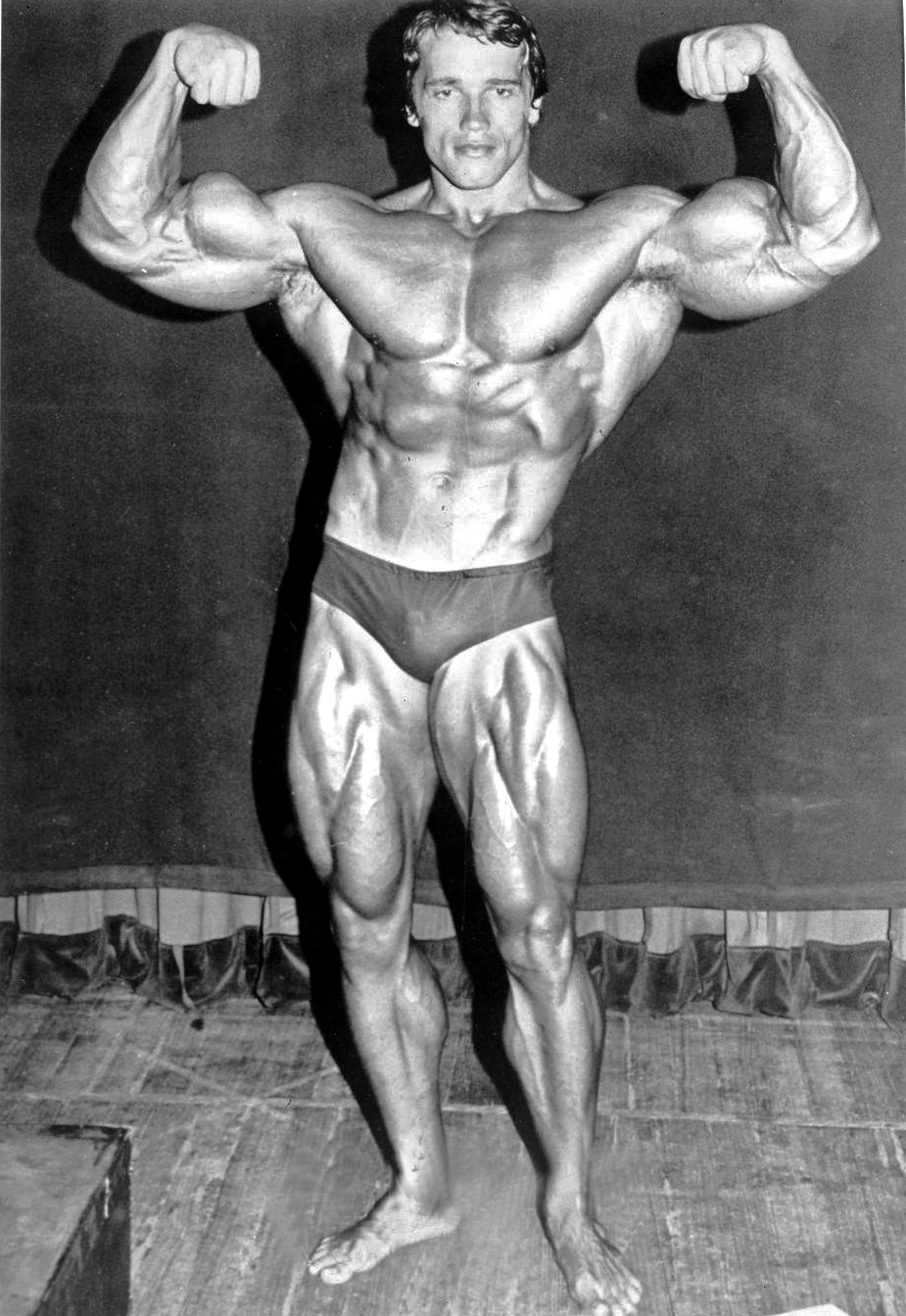
Arnold Schwarzenegger

- Edin Ibrahimovic, volleyball player
- Kate Allen, triathlete (Olympic champion 2004)
- Toni Fritsch, NFL football player, Super Bowl VI champion
- Stephanie Graf, runner (not related to German tennis player Steffi Graf)
- Alfred Guth (1908–1996), Austrian-born American water polo player, swimmer, and Olympic modern pentathlete
- Walter Hahn, professional wrestler, known as his ring name "Gunther"
- Claudia Heill, judoka
- Mickey Hirschl, wrestler, 2x Olympic bronze (heavyweight freestyle and Greco-Roman), shot put and discus junior champion, weightlifting junior champion, and pentathlon champion
- Malena Kernacs (born 2002), wheel gymnast
- Alfred König (1913–1987), Austrian-Turkish Olympic sprinter
- Sylven Landesberg (born 1990), American-Israeli-Austrian basketball player
- Manfred Magnus (born 1939), motorcycle racer
- Jasmin Ouschan, pool-billiards player
- Rowby-John Rodriguez, darts player
- Nicole Trimmel, kickboxer
- Arnold Schwarzenegger, body builder
- Peter Seisenbacher, judoka (Olympic champion 1984 and 1988)
- Christoph Sieber, surfer (Olympic champion 2000)
- Mensur Suljović, darts player
- Elisabeth Theurer, horse rider
- Georg Totschnig, cyclist
- Christine Wolf, golfer
