= Fritzi Löwy =

Austrian swimmer (1910–1994)

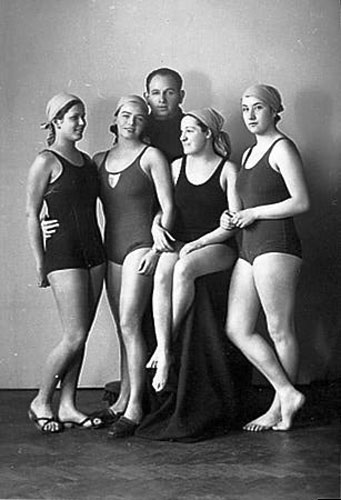
- Hakoah Vienna swimmers and coach; from left: Judith Deutsch, Hedy Bienenfeld, Coach Zsigo Wertheimer, Fritzi Löwy, and Luci Goldner

Personal information
- Born: 18 November 1910 Vienna, Austria
- Died: 13 March 1994 (aged 83) Vienna, Austria

Sport
- Sport: Swimming
- Events: freestyle, breaststroke
- Club: Hakoah Vienna
Medal record
Women's swimming
Representing Austria
European Championships
Bronze medal – third place	1927 Bologna	400 m freestyle
Maccabiah Games
Gold medal – first place	1932 Israel	100 m freestyle
Gold medal – first place	1932 Israel	300 m freestyle
Gold medal – first place	1932 Israel	4x100 m freestyle
Gold medal – first place	1935 Israel	400 m freestyle
Gold medal – first place	1935 Israel	4x100 m freestyle
Silver medal – second place	1932 Israel	200 m breaststroke

Friederike "Fritzi" Löwy (18 November 1910 – 13 March 1994) was an Austrian Olympic swimmer. She won a bronze medal in the 400 m freestyle at the 1927 European Aquatics Championships. That same year she set the European record in the 200m freestyle. She competed in freestyle at the 1928 Summer Olympics, but did not reach the finals.

== Early life ==
Löwy was born in Vienna, Austria. She was the youngest of seven children, and was Jewish.

== Swimming career ==
In the 1920s Löwy started swimming in the Jewish sports club Hakoah Vienna, which had been founded in 1909 in response to the "Aryan clause" that banned Jews from joining other sports clubs. For several years after 1925 she won the annual Austrian five-mile open-water swimming competition Quer durch Wien (Across Vienna) on the Danube that drew some 500,000 spectators. During the 1920s–30s she also collected nearly every national title in freestyle.

Löwy won a bronze medal in the 400 m freestyle at the 1927 European Aquatics Championships in Bologna, Italy, at 16 years of age. Until the 2000s, Löwy remained the only Austrian to win a swimming medal, together with Hedy Bienenfeld, who finished third in the 200 breaststroke at the same 1927 European Aquatics Championships. That same year she set the European record in the 200m freestyle.

She competed in freestyle at the 1928 Summer Olympics in the Netherlands, at 17 years of age, but did not reach the finals.

Löwy competed in the 1932 Maccabiah Games in Mandatory Palestine. There she won gold medals in the women's 100m freestyle and 300m freestyle, and won a silver medal in the 200m breaststroke behind Hedy Bienenfeld.

== Later life ==
Soon after the Anschluss between Germany and Austria in 1938, the annexation of Austria by Nazi Germany before World War II, Löwy fled from Jewish persecutions first to Milan, Italy at the end of 1939, and then to Switzerland in 1944 after her sister was arrested in Milan and deported to the Auschwitz concentration camp, and then to Australia after the war ended. She returned to Vienna in 1949 and worked as a secretary.

Löwy was a rival of fellow Austrian swimmer Hedy Bienenfeld, but they later became close friends, and Bienenfeld helped her financially around the 1960s when Löwy was fighting breast cancer. Löwy was bisexual, and had no children. She died in Vienna in 1994.

== See also ==
- List of European Aquatics Championships medalists in swimming (women)
