= Bartsch =

Bartsch is a German surname. Notable people with the surname include:

- Adam Bartsch (1757–1821), German scholar of old master prints and artist
- Darren Bartsch (born 1969), Australian rules footballer
- Dieter Bartsch, Austrian alpine skiing coach
- Dietmar Bartsch (born 1958), German politician (Die Linke)
- Jacob Bartsch (1600–1633), German astronomer
- Johann Bartsch (1709–1738), German botanist
- Jürgen Bartsch (1946–1976), German serial killer
- Karl Bartsch (1832–1888), German medievalist and philologist
- Karl-Heinz Bartsch (1923–2003), German politician
- Nik Bärtsch (born 1971), Swiss pianist, composer and producer
- Paul Bartsch (1871–1960), German-American biologist, zoologist and malacologist
- Renate Bartsch (born 1939), German philosopher of language
- Richard Bartsch (born 1959), German politician
- Rudolf Hans Bartsch (1873–1952), Austrian writer
- Subaru Kimura (born 1990), Japanese voice actor, born Subaru Samuel Bartsch
- Susanne Bartsch (born 1968), German writer

== See also ==
- Bartsch's Squid
- Bartsch's law
