= František Getreuer =

Czech water polo player (1906–1945)

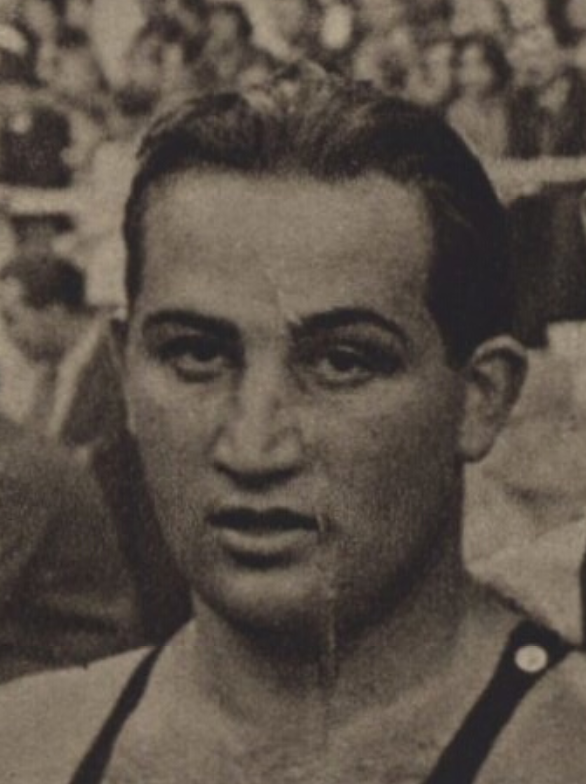
- Getreuer in 1932

Personal information
- Nationality: Czech
- Born: 18 December 1906
- Died: 6 February 1945 (aged 38) Dachau concentration camp, Nazi Germany
- Home town: Prague

Sport
- Sport: Water polo
Medal record
Men's swimming and water polo
Representing Czechoslovakia
Maccabiah Games
Gold medal – first place	1935 Mandatory Palestine	400m freestyle
Gold medal – first place	1935 Mandatory Palestine	1,500m freestyle
Gold medal – first place	1935 Mandatory Palestine	water polo

František Getreuer (18 December 1906 – 6 February 1945) was a Czech national champion swimmer and Olympic water polo player. He was murdered in Dachau concentration camp.

== Biography ==
Getreuer competed in the men's tournament at the 1928 Summer Olympics, coming in 9th with the Czechoslovak water polo team.

He won the gold medal in the 400m freestyle in the Third Slavic Swimming Championship in Warsaw, Poland, in 1929. In the 1930 Czechoslovak Championship held, Getreuer won gold medals in the 200m freestyle, 400m freestyle, 1,500m freestyle, and 4x200-meter freestyle relay.

At the 1935 Maccabiah Games in Mandatory Palestine, Getreuer won gold medals in the 400m freestyle and the 1,500m freestyle, as well as a team gold medal in water polo.

Getreuer was Jewish. He lived in Prague, and was deported to Terezín concentration camp on 12 April 1941. He was later transported from Terezín to Auschwitz concentration camp on 28 September 1944. He was murdered on 6 February 1945, at 38 years of age, in Dachau concentration camp, in Bayern, Germany.
