= Eduard Glass =

Austrian chess player

Eduard (Esra) Glass (born 1902 - died after 1980) was an Austrian chess master.

He won at Vienna 1927, and shared 1st with Erich Eliskases at Innsbruck 1929 (Austrian Chess Championship). He played several times in the Trebitsch Memorial in Vienna.

Glass represented Austria in the 5th Chess Olympiad at Folkestone, 1933. In April 1935, he tied for third to fifth place in Tel Aviv (the 2nd Maccabiah Games, Abram Blass won). He tied for eighth to tenth place at Budapest 1936 (Mieczysław Najdorf and Lajos Steiner won). After the Anschluss in 1938, he was imprisoned in Dachau concentration camp where he won the camp chess tournament once ahead of Georg Klaus. Later, he moved to China and survived World War II while living in the Shanghai Ghetto.

After the war, Glass participated in the first Israeli Chess Championship in 1951. There, he scored eight points in thirteen games to finish third. The winner, Menachem Oren, achieved nine points. Later, Glass placed fifteenth at Marianske Lazne 1959 (Lev Polugaevsky won), and took fifth at Reggio Emilia in 1960-61.
