= Ben Bril =

Dutch boxer

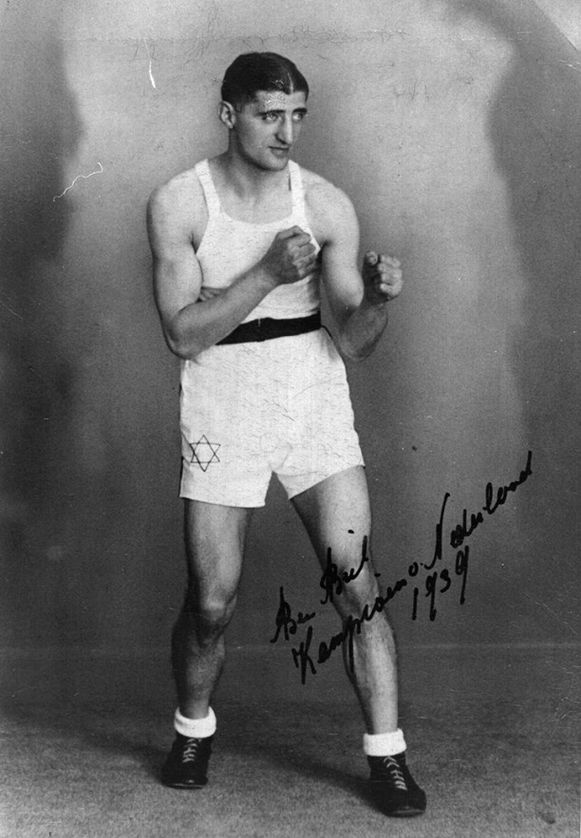
- Bril in 1939

Personal information
- Nationality: Netherlands
- Born: Barend Bril; 16 July 1912 Amsterdam, Netherlands
- Died: 11 September 2003 (aged 91) Amsterdam, Netherlands
- Weight: Flyweight; Lightweight

Boxing career
- Stance: Orthodox
Medal record
Men's Boxing
Representing the Netherlands
Olympic Games Flyweight Division
1928 Summer Olympics Amsterdam

Barend "Ben" Bril (16 July 1912 – 11 September 2003) was a Dutch boxer who competed in the 1928 Amsterdam Summer Olympics in Flyweight boxing, and became an accomplished European boxing referee and judge in the 1960s.

== Early life and career ==
Bril was born in Valkenburgstraat, a poor section of Amsterdam to Jewish parents Abraham Bril and Klaartie Moffie on 16 July 1912. He was one of six children of a struggling family supported primarily by their father's work as a fisherman. Bril competed in the 1928 Summer Olympics at age 15 in his home town, finishing fifth in the flyweight class, just out of medal contention. In his Olympic competition, after a first round bye, he defeated Myles McDonagh of Ireland, before losing to Buddy Lebanon of South Africa.

Four years later he was barred from the 1932 Summer Olympics because the Dutch Olympic Committee was led by a member of the Dutch Nazi party. He later boycotted the 1936 Games in Berlin.

In his boxing career before the war, beginning in 1928, he won the Dutch Amateur National Championship a total of eight times. As a high point in his amateur career, he won a gold medal at the 1935 Maccabiah Games, held in Tel Aviv, Israel.

== Internment at Bergen-Belsen concentration camp ==
During the German occupation of the Netherlands after 1940, Bril, his wife Celia and son were forced to go into hiding above what was once his family's bakery, but in 1942 were arrested by Nazi sympathiser, Jan Olij a neighbor, whose father, Sam Olij, had boxed together with Bril in the 1928 Olympics. Around 1942, he was first sent to the Vught Transit Camp, a concentration camp in Southern Holland with deplorable conditions, located Southeast of his home in Amsterdam. Once deported to Northern Germany and interned at the Bergen-Belsen concentration camp, Bril was able to get a job, and then a promotion to the position of Blockälteste, which put him in charge of his barrack. Looking to survive, he was selected to box in the camp, where he let known German boxers defeat him. Four of his brothers and a sister died in the camps. All but one of the siblings were married with children. Ben, his wife, and his younger brother Herrie survived the war. Herrie Bril died in Rotterdam on 6 August 1966. Sam Olij was eventually jailed and died in the Netherlands in 1975, while Jan fled to Argentina and died there in 1996.

== Work as a referee ==
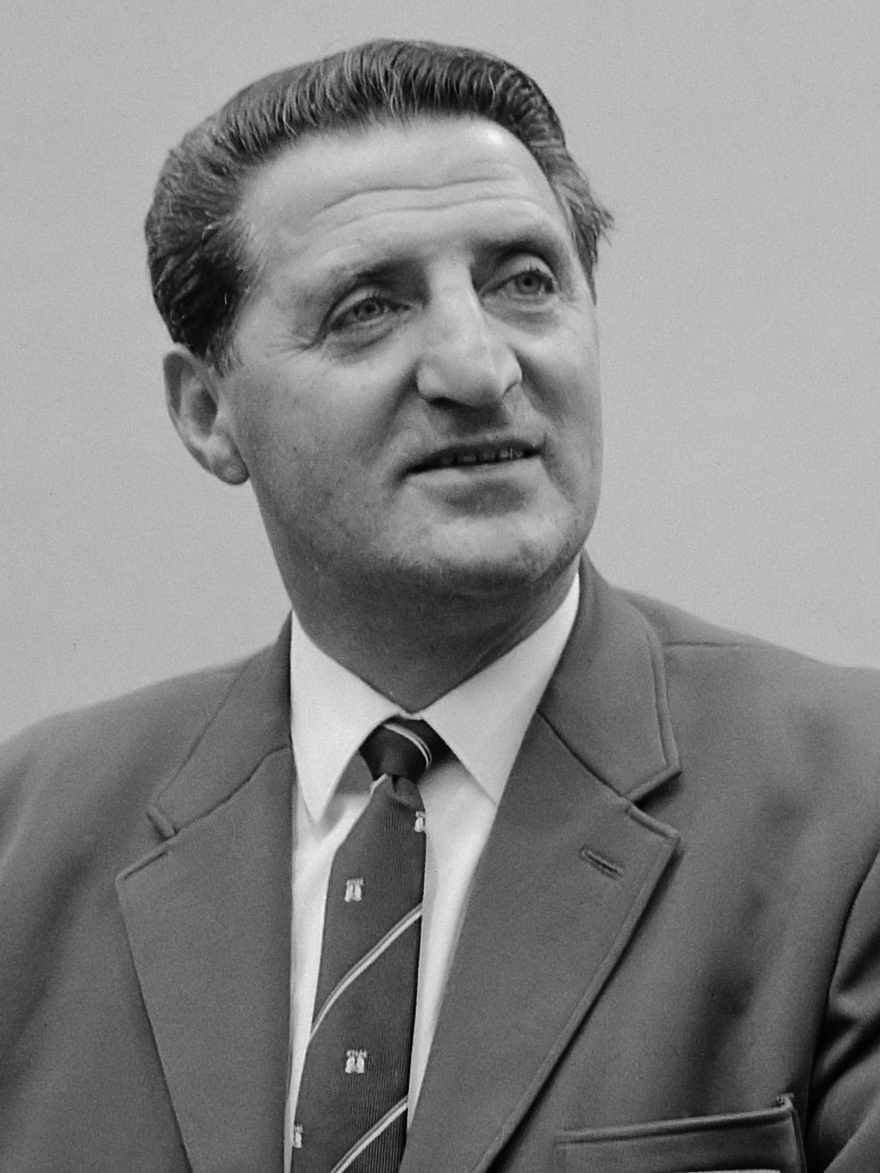
Bril in 1965

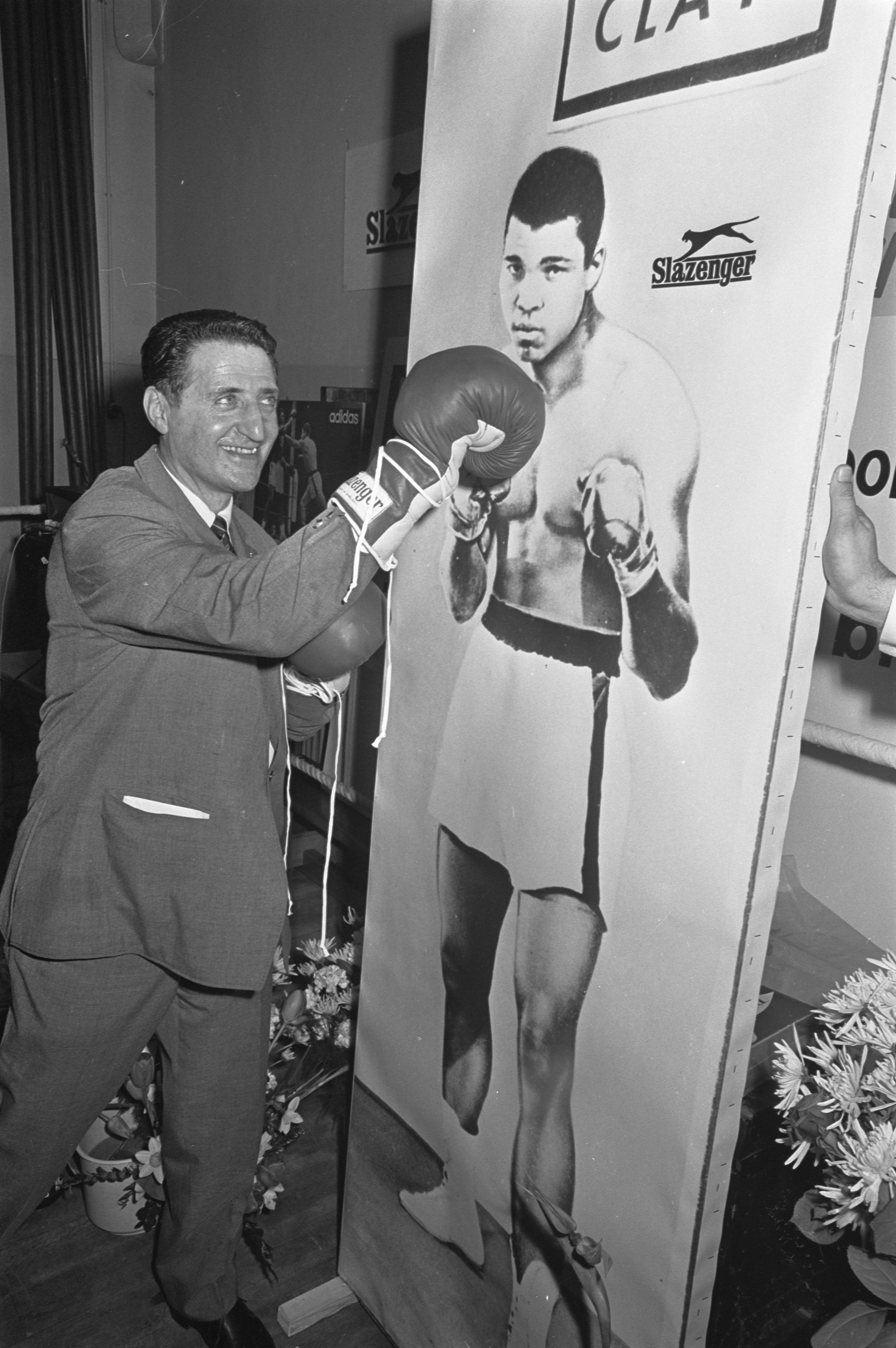
Bril in 1968

From 1963-74, Bril found fame working as a boxing referee for many important matches throughout Europe. Most of the fights he refereed were title fights for the European Boxing Union, that brought him to matches in Berlin, Vienna, Madrid, Paris, London, and throughout Europe. Bril also refereed Olympic fights, overseeing the matches of George Frazier at the 1964 Summer Olympics in Tokyo, George Foreman at the 1968 Summer Olympics in Mexico City, and for Teófilo Stevenson a Cuban heavyweight, who competed in boxing in three Summer Olympics from 1972-1980. He also refereed boxing matches for the 1973 Maccabiah Games.

Bril and his wife Celia had one child Ab Ben, who lives in Zandvoort with his wife Wilma. Ab Ben and Wilma have one son, Benno, who also lives in Zandvoort.

Bril died on 11 September 2003, at the age of 91 at the Beth Shalom Retirement Home in Amsterdam, and was buried at the Jewish cemetery of Muiderberg. He is still considered an heroic figure in the Netherlands. After his death, the Ben Bril Memorial Boxing Gala, which continues today, was inaugurated to honor his memory. The event features a series of boxing matches and is held every October in Amsterdam.

In October 2006 Bril's biography Ben Bril - Davidsster als Ereteken, by Ed van Opzeeland was published. The English translation of the title is Ben Bril - Decorated with a Star of David. The Dutch swimmer Erica Terpstra handed out the first copy of the book to Ben's only son Albert Bril.

== Select fights officiated by Bril ==
Primarily EBU European Bouts, 1963-73
Result	Opponents	Date	Location	Duration	Notes
Aldridge Won	Laslo Papp vs. George Aldridge	6 Feb 1963	Vienna	15 Round TKO	EBU Eur. Middle Title
Rollo Won	Minmoun Ben Ali vs. Pierro Rollo	19 Jul 1963	Madrid	15 Round	EBU Eur. Bantam Title
Preberg Won	Ivan Prebeg vs. Karl Mildenberger	15 Jun 1966	Frankfort, Ger.	15 Round	EBU Eur. Heavy Title
Walker Won	Billy Walker vs. Karl Mildenberger	21 Mar 1967	London, UK	8 Round TKO	EBU Eur. Heavy Title
Swift Won	Sandro Mazzinghi vs. Wally Swift	9 Sep 1967	Milan, Ital.	6 Round TKO	EBU Super Welter Title
Zech Won	Karl Mildenberger vs. Gerhard Zech	30 Dec 1967	Berlin, Ger.	15 Round	EBU Europ. Heavy Title
Tomasoni Won	Henry Cooper vs. Pierro Tomasoni	13 Mar 1969	Rome, Ital.	5th Round KO	EBU Europ. Heavy Title
Duran Won	Tom Boggs vs. Carlo Duran	11 Sep 1969	Copenhagen	15 Rounds	EBU Europ. Middle Title
Bossi Won	Yohann Orsolics vs. Carmello Bossi	9 Apr 1970	Vienna, Aus	15 Rounds	EBU Europ. Welter Title
Fullmer Won	Tom Bogs vs. Don Fullmer	11 Feb 1971	Copenhagen	10 Rounds	
Duivenbode Won	Ruddi Lubbers vs. Bas Van Duivenbode	17 May 1971	Amsterdam	12 Round	Dutch Heavy Title
Duran Won	Jean Claude Bouttier vs. Carlo Duran	9 June 1971	Paris	15 Rounds UD	EBU European Middle Title; Bril acted as Judge
Legra Won	Jose Legra vs. Tommy Glencross	17 May 1972	Birmingham, England	15 Rounds SD	For Europ. Feather title
Franco Zurlo Won	Franco Zurlo vs. Johnny Clark	17 April 1973	London, UK	15 Round	Vac. EBU Europ. Bantam Title
