= Yosef Dobkin =

Israeli chess player (1909–1977)

Yosef (Joseph) Dobkin (Hebrew: יוסף דובקין; 13 August 1909 – 9 April 1977) was an Israeli chess master.

Dobkin was born in the Russian Empire. He immigrated to Palestine (British Mandate) in 1924 and studied chemistry at the Hebrew University. He did his Ph.D. thesis and joined the Department of Physiology. He was an accomplished chess player and received an international master's degree.

In April 1935, he tied for 3rd-5th in Tel Aviv (the 2nd Maccabiah Games, Abram Blass won). He played for the Palestine/Israeli team in two Chess Olympiads; at third board (+2 –7 =6) in the 6th Olympiad at Warsaw 1935, and at first reserve board (+2 –5 =2) in the 12th Olympiad at Moscow 1956.

In 1974, he took 16th in the Israeli Chess Championship (Vladimir Liberzon and Moshe Czerniak won).
