= Sam Olij =

Dutch heavyweight boxer

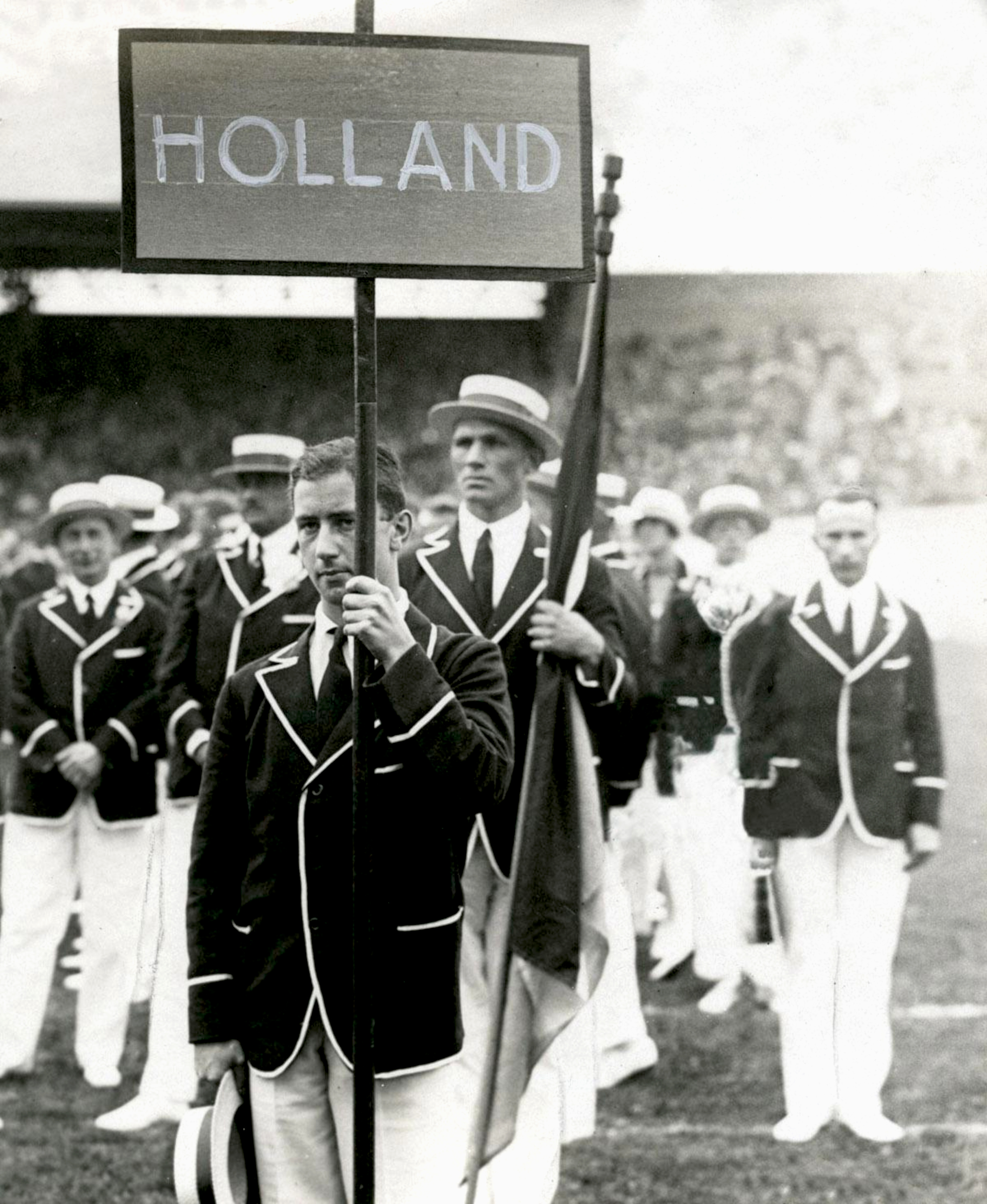
Olij bearing the Dutch flag at the 1928 Olympics

Simon Paulus Olij (5 October 1900, Landsmeer – 4 August 1975, Amsterdam) was a Dutch heavyweight boxer who attended the 1928 Summer Olympics. During World War II, he was a Nazi collaborator. Olij was later sentenced to death but was reprieved and served a seven-year prison sentence.

== Boxing ==
There he was eliminated in the quarterfinals of the men's heavyweight division by eventual gold medalist Arturo Rodríguez from Argentina. His result was: (in Dutch)

- Round of 16: defeated Joe Goyder (Great Britain) by decision
- Quarterfinal: lost to Arturo Rodriguez (Argentina) on points

== Nazi collaborator ==
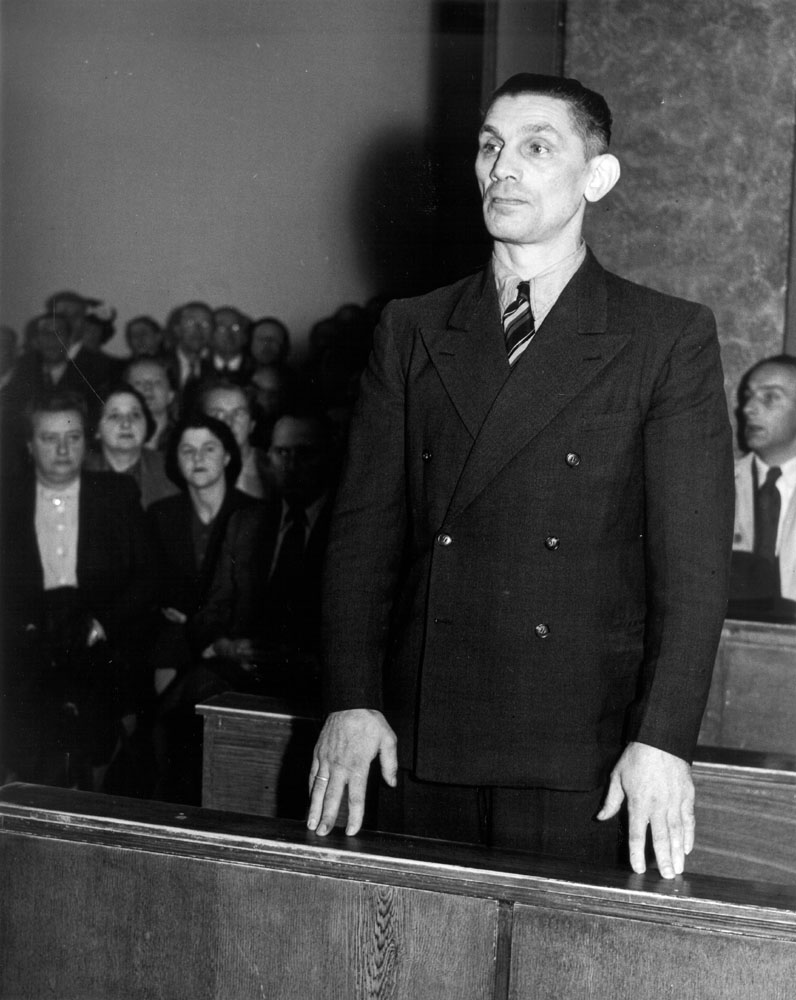
Sam Olij standing trial at the Special Court in Amsterdam on 3 October 1947

Olij, and his son Jan, became members of the National Socialist Movement in the Netherlands (NSB) during the Second World War. Olij and his son betrayed and arrested numerous Jewish people who were deported as part of The Holocaust. One of them was fellow Jewish Dutch boxing Olympian Ben Bril and his family.

After the war he was sentenced to death for his role in The Holocaust. However, his sentence was commuted to life imprisonment which itself was repealed. After a psychiatric assessment Olij had his sentence commuted to nine years imprisonment. He was released in June 1954. His son, Jan, while awaiting trial escaped from an internment camp in 1947 and fled to Argentina where he died in 1996.

== Later life ==
Olij died in 1975 in Amsterdam.

== Legacy ==
Olij futures together with boxer Ben Bril in one of the episodes of the 2026 season of Het verhaal van Nederland.

Olympic Games
Preceded by Adrianus de Jong	Flagbearer for Netherlands; Amsterdam 1928	Succeeded by Charles Pahud de Mortanges
