= Harald Ruckendorfer =

Austrian footballer

Personal information
- Full name: Harald Ruckendorfer
- Date of birth: 5 December 1982 (age 43)
- Place of birth: Austria
- Height: 1.76 m (5 ft 9 in)
- Position: Midfielder

Youth career
- Union Reichenthal

Senior career*
Years	Team	Apps	(Gls)
2001–2008	LASK Linz	107	(9)
2008	1. FC Vöcklabruck		
2008–present	Vorwärts Steyr	2	(0)
- * Club domestic league appearances and goals as of 15 August 2008

Harald Ruckendorfer (born 5 December 1982) is an Austrian footballer who currently plays for Austrian team Vorwärts Steyr.

== Club career ==
Ruckendorfer played at LASK Linz for seven years, before moving to Second division side 1. FC Vöcklabruck in January 2008. In summer 2008 he joined Landesliga Ost outfit Steyr.
