= Hedy Bienenfeld =

Austrian-American swimmer (1907–1976)

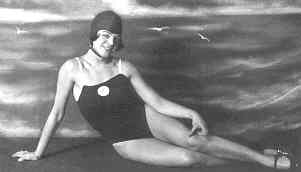
- Hedy Bienenfeld-Wertheimer

Personal information
- Full name: Hedwig (Hedy) Bienenfeld-Wertheimer
- Citizenship: Austrian-American
- Born: 17 October 1907 Vienna, Austria
- Died: September 24, 1976 (aged 68)
- Resting place: Vienna Central Cemetery

Sport
- Sport: Swimming
- Event(s): breaststroke, freestyle
- Club: Hakoah Vienna
Medal record
Women's swimming
Representing Austria
European Championships
Bronze medal – third place	1927, Bologna	200 m breaststroke
Maccabiah Games
Gold medal – first place	1932, Haifa	200 m breaststroke
Gold medal – first place	1932, Haifa	100 m backstroke
Gold medal – first place	1932, Haifa	4x100 m freestyle
Gold medal – first place	1935, Haifa	200 m breaststroke
Gold medal – first place	1935, Haifa	4x100 m freestyle
Silver medal – second place	1932, Haifa	100 m freestyle
Bronze medal – third place	1932, Haifa	300 m freestyle

Hedwig "Hedy" Bienenfeld, also known after marriage as Hedy Wertheimer (17 October 1907 – 24 September 1976) was an Austrian Olympic swimmer. She won a bronze medal in the 200m breaststroke at the 1927 European Aquatics Championships. She competed in the same discipline at the 1928 Summer Olympics. At the 1932 Maccabiah Games and 1935 Maccabiah Games in Mandatory Palestine, she won a combined five gold medals, one silver medal, and one bronze medal in swimming.

== Biography ==
=== Swimming career ===
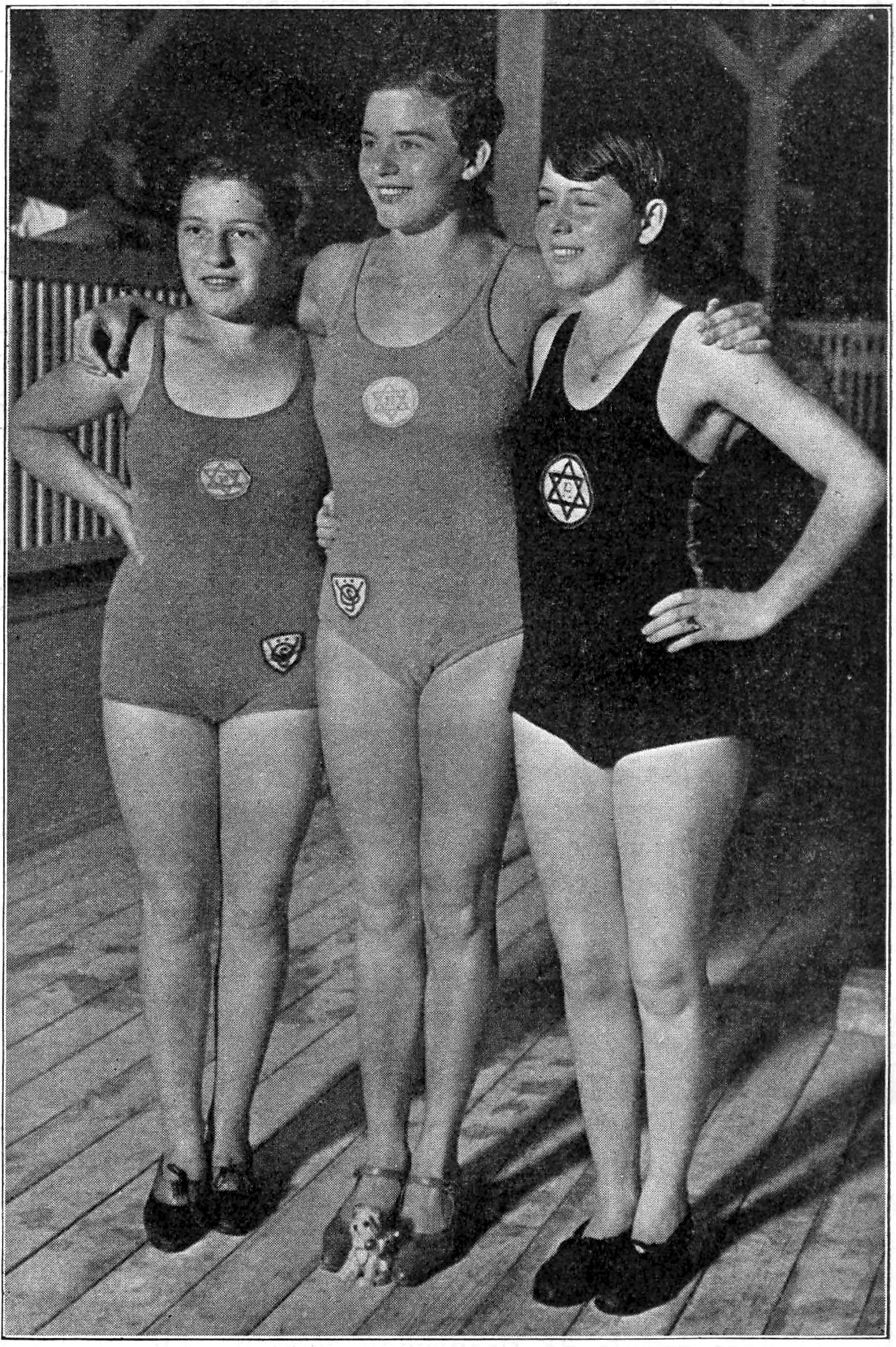
Hakoah Vienna swimmers Fritzi Löwy, Hedy Bienenfeld, and Idy Kohn (1927).

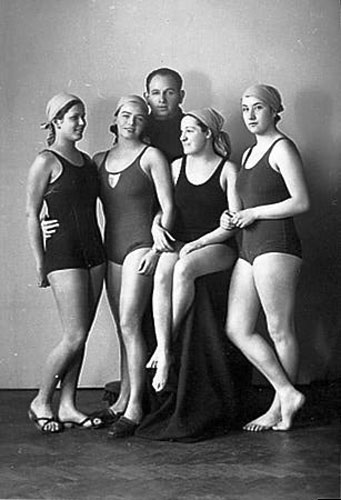
Hakoah Vienna swimmers and coach; from left: Judith Deutsch, Hedy Bienenfeld, Coach Zsigo Wertheimer, Fritzi Löwy, and Luci Goldner

Bienenfeld was Jewish, and competed for the Jewish sports club Hakoah Vienna, which had been founded in 1909 in response to the "Aryan clause" that banned Jews from joining other sports clubs.

In 1924, at 15 years of age, Bienenfeld won the annual Austrian five-mile open-water swimming competition Quer durch Wien (Across Vienna) on the Danube that gathered about 500,000 spectators. In 1925, she was second, after Löwy who swam freestyle.

Subsequently, she became a popular swimsuit model for Austrian magazines. She won nearly every Austrian national breaststroke title in the 1920s–1930s.

Bienenfeld won a bronze medal in the 200 m breaststroke at the 1927 European Aquatics Championships in Italy, at 19 years of age. Until the 2000s, Bienenfeld remained the only Austrian to win a swimming medal, together with Fritzi Löwy, who finished third in the 400 m freestyle at the same 1927 European Aquatics Championships.

She competed in the women's 200 m breaststroke at the 1928 Summer Olympics at 20 years of age, and came in 13th.

On 28 April 1929, Bienenfeld established the world 500m breaststroke record, at nine minutes. She was the inspiration for the character "Lisa" in the novel The Pupil Gerber (Der Schüler Gerber) by Friedrich Torberg, which was published the following year.

In 1930, she married her swimming coach, Zsigo Wertheimer (1897–1965). In 1937, she set a new Austrian 100m breaststroke record.

At the 1932 Maccabiah Games in Mandatory Palestine she won gold medals in the 100m backstroke, 200m breaststroke, and 4x100 m freestyle, a silver medal in the 100m freestyle (as Löwy won the gold medal), and the bronze medal in the 300m freestyle.

At the 1935 Maccabiah Games in Mandatory Palestine she won gold medals in the 200m breaststroke and 4x100m freestyle.

=== Later life ===
Being Jewish, she and her husband fled Austria after its 1938 annexation by Nazi Germany before World War II, known as the Anschluss, and moved first to Great Britain landing at Dover on 8 December 1939, and on 18 July 1940 were interned in Rushen Internment Camp on the Isle of Man. They then moved to London on 31 December 1940, and then to the United States.

There, they worked as swimming instructors in New York, and then ran a successful real estate business in Florida. In 1952, they became American citizens. After the death of her husband in 1965, she returned to Vienna. There she helped financially her lifelong rival and then close friend Löwy, who was fighting breast cancer. Bienenfeld did not have any children. Upon her death, she was buried in the Jewish section of Vienna Central Cemetery.

== See also ==
- List of European Aquatics Championships medalists in swimming (women)
