= 1935 Maccabiah Games =

2nd Maccabiah
- Host city: Tel Aviv, Mandatory Palestine
- Nations: 28
- Debuting countries: 10
- Athletes: 1,350
- Events: 18
- Opening: April 2, 1935
- Closing: April 10, 1935
- Main venue: Maccabiah Stadium

Summer

Winter

The 2nd Maccabiah (Hebrew: המכביה השנייה), aka the Aliyah Olympics, which was held in April 1935, was the second edition of the Maccabiah Games. The Games were held despite official opposition by the British Mandatory government. A total of 28 countries were represented by 1,350 athletes. Austria placed first, followed by Germany in second, with Eretz Israel placing third.

== History ==
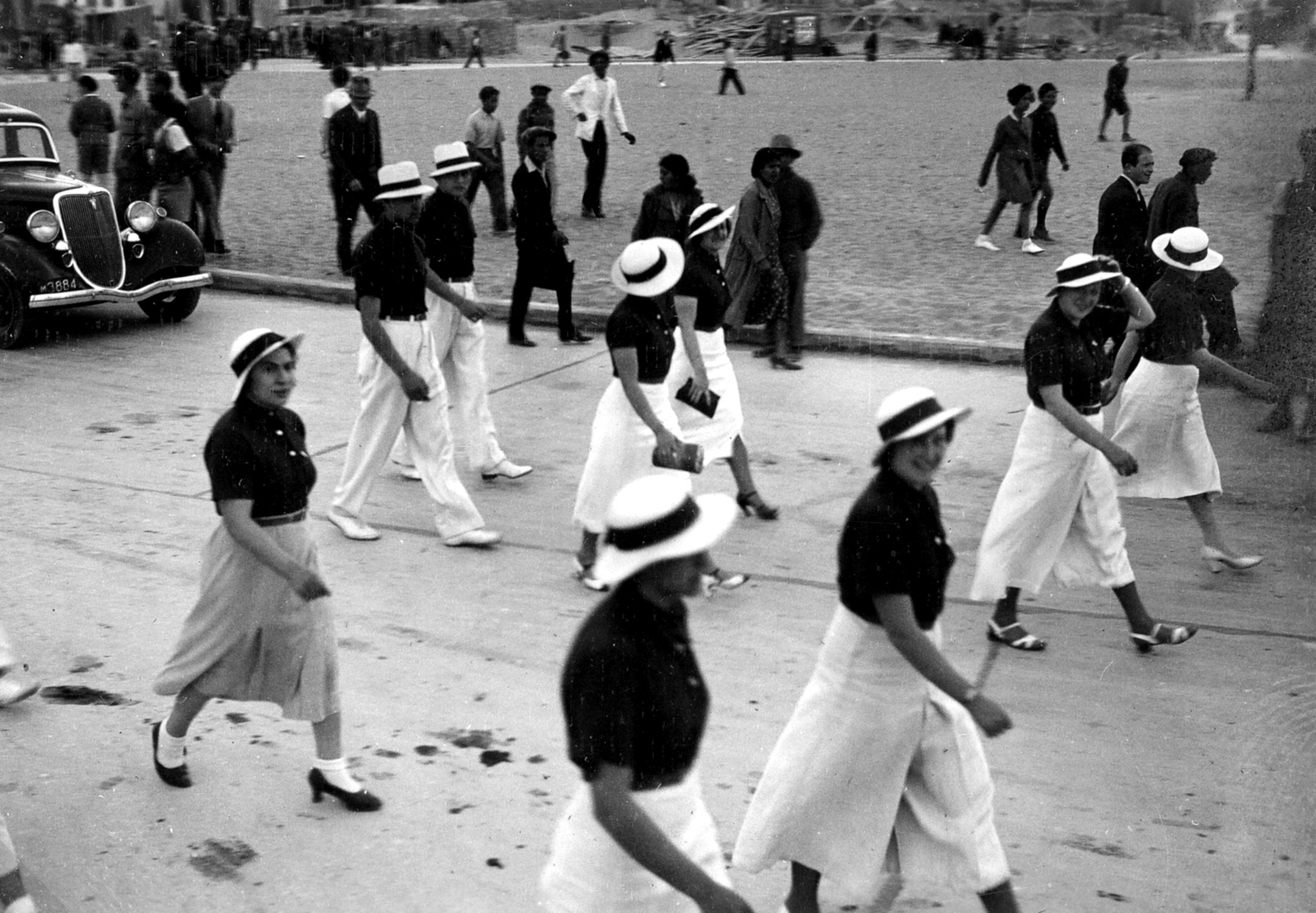
The Austrian delegation on its way to the stadium during the opening ceremony of the 2nd Maccabiah Games.

After the success of the 1st Maccabiah in 1932, the Maccabi World Union decided to host a second Maccabiah. In order to not make it look like they were imitating the Olympic Games, the 2nd Maccabiah took place 3 years after the first, in the spring of 1935. Eretz Yisrael enjoyed that year a relative economic boom. Tel Aviv has grown and main streets were paved. The stadium also has grown and added many new viewing locations. The second Maccabiah resulted in the settlement's first swimming pool (50 meters) in Bat Galim, Haifa. The pool was used throughout the games in the swimming competitions (during the 1st Maccabiah, the swimming competitions took place in the sea).

"If two years ago we had doubts about the success of the daring attempt to establish Olympics in Israel, now success is assured."

— Israel Rokach, Haaretz; 04/02/35; deputy mayor of Tel Aviv.

The second Maccabiah was organized and held in the early years of Nazi rule in Germany and after Hitler came to power in 1933. Maccabi used the games as a means of enabling Jews to emigrate to Eretz Yisrael clandestinely. It was for that reason that the games were nicknamed the Aliyah Olympics. The games faced strong opposition by the British Mandatory government due to concern of mass illegal immigration. One of the most notable examples was the Bulgarian delegation, where all 350 of its members stayed in Palestine; even the entire Maccabi Bulgaria orchestra that came with them and performed at the opening and closing ceremonies stayed. Only their sports equipment and musical instruments were shipped back. Additionally, the majority of the German and Polish team took the opportunity to stay in Palestine.

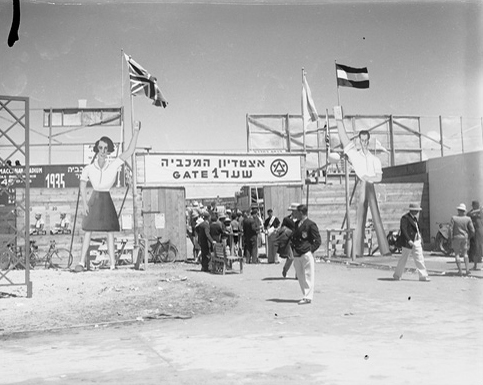
Gate 1 at the Maccabiah Stadium during the 2nd Maccabiah.

Unlike the first Maccabiah which was planned in just under three months, the second Maccabiah took just over a year, which significantly increased costs. As a result, the Maccabiah organizing committee faced severe budgetary problems. The Maccabi Eretz Yisrael Fund was so poor, quoting "The budget was barely enough for the postage-stamps". As such, it was decided that the Maccabiah be supported financially by the World Maccabi Union – with Maccabi Eretz Yisrael still responsible for the planning of the games.

Maccabi organized a large Maccabiah fund. Special Maccabiah offices were opened for this purpose in London, Alexandria, Berlin, Warsaw, Prague and Tel Aviv. A special office was also opened in South Africa. Tickets for the Maccabiah competitions were sold at various trade centers and across all drugstores in Tel Aviv.

Members of the U.S. delegation traveled to Palestine on the SS President Roosevelt in March.

== Opening ceremony ==
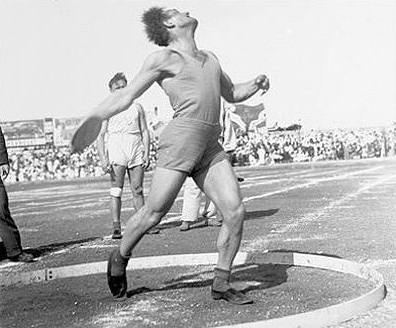
Discus thrower at the 2nd Maccabiah.

Despite the opposition of the British Mandate Police, a large number of athletes participated in the parade that went through the streets of Tel Aviv. For the 2nd Maccabiah, Lord Melchett served as Honorary President of Maccabi and sponsored the games; "In defiance of the British government's strict limitations on aliyah [seeking permanent residence], many competitors took advantage of their being in the Holy Land and decided to stay."

Among 15 anthems, the one by Yigal Caspi was chosen as the official Maccabiah Anthem; it was sung during the opening and closing ceremonies.

== Notable competitors ==
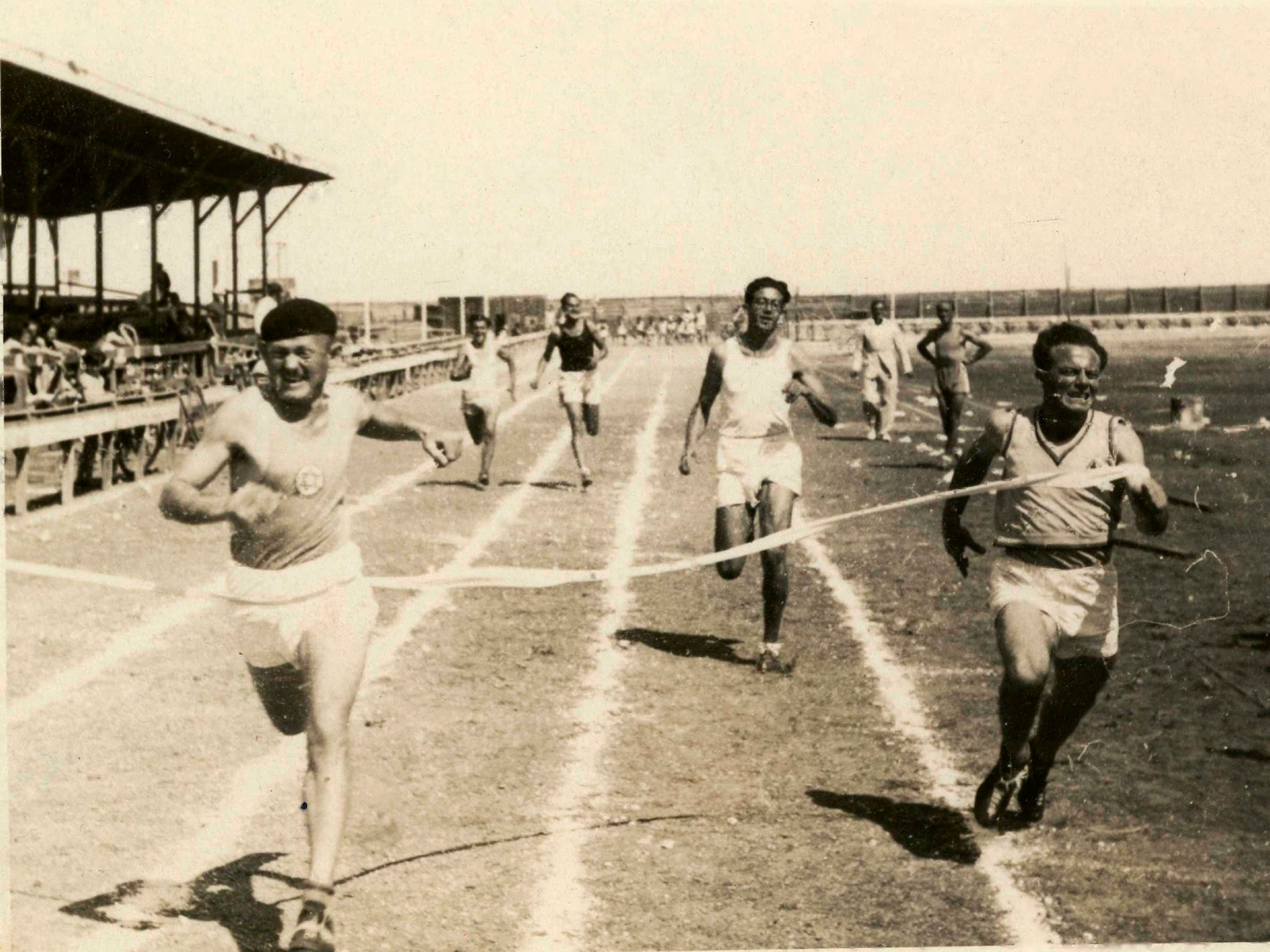
Sprinters; 2nd Maccabiah.

In track and field, from the American team, Olympic champion Lillian Copeland stood out, winning gold medals in the discus (37.38 meters), javelin (36.92 meters), and shot put (12.32 meters). Future Olympic sprinter Alfred König competed for Austria, winning a gold medal in the 200m dash, was part of the gold medal-winning 4 × 400 m relay, won a silver medal in the 400m race, and won a bronze medal in the 4 × 100 m relay.

In boxing, Ben Bril, Olympian and eight-time Dutch national champion, won a gold medal for the Netherlands. In tennis, Karol Altschuler won a gold medal for Poland, previously winning Junior Champion of Poland in 1930.

In swimming, Olympian Pavol Steiner of Czechoslovakia won two gold medals, in the 100m freestyle and in the 4 × 200 m freestyle relay. He also won a team gold medal in water polo, as Czechoslovakia came out ahead of Austria and Palestine. Czech Olympian František Getreuer won gold medals in swimming in the 400m freestyle and the 1,500m freestyle. Austrian Olympic swimmer Hedy Bienenfeld won gold medals in the 200m breaststroke and 4 × 100 m freestyle. Austrian swimmer and national record holder Ruth Langer won a bronze medal in the 200 m breaststroke; the next year, despite qualifying, she declined to compete for Austria in the Olympics in Nazi Germany, which led to her being banned from competing and her records erased by Austria. Polish future Olympian Ilia Szrajbman competed in swimming; he was killed in the Majdanek concentration camp during the Holocaust.

In chess, Abram Blass won a gold medal for Poland, followed by David Enoch, Eduard Glass, Heinz Josef Foerder, Yosef Dobkin, Victor Winz, Moshe Czerniak, and Siegmund Beutum.

In the final scoring, Austria placed first with 399 points, followed by Germany with 375.3 points, and Eretz Israel placed third with 360.5 points. They were followed by Poland 4th, USA 5th, Czechoslovakia 6th, South Africa 7th, Egypt 8th, Yugoslavia 9th, Great Britain 10th, France 11th, Romania 12th, the Netherlands 13th, Denmark 14th, DZG 15th, Greece 16th, Belgium 17th, Morocco 18th, and Latvia, Libya, and Lithuania tied for 19th.

== Sports ==
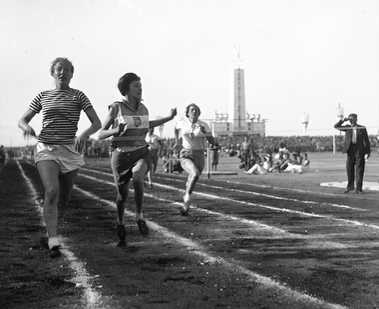
Sprinters at the 2nd Maccabiah.

The 2nd Maccabiah introduced many new sports including: judo, cycling, weightlifting, rowing, volleyball, and darts. The 2nd Maccabiah was the last time motorcycle racing took place. Handball and Basketball which were played during the 1st Maccabiah did not take place in this one; they were played in the 3rd Maccabiah.

Games that took place:

- Athletics
- Cycling
- Darts
- Judo
- Motorcycle Racing
- Motor Racing
- Rowing
- Swimming
- Volleyball
- Weightlifting

== Participating communities ==
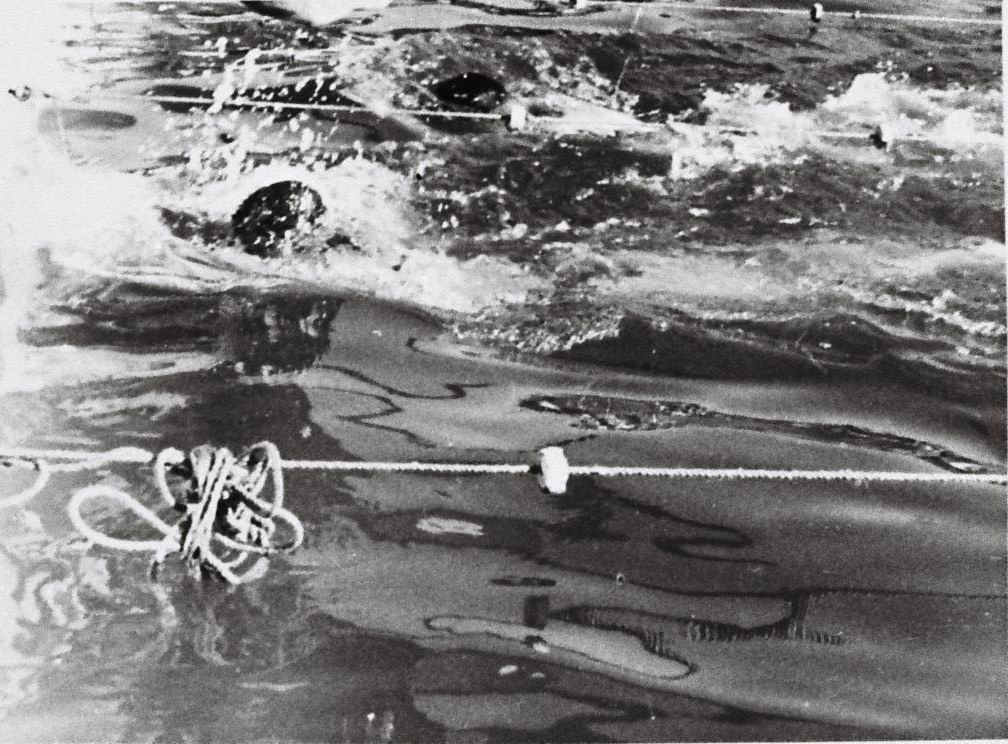
Swimming competition

28 Delegations took park in the 3rd Maccabiah. The number in parentheses indicates the size of the delegation.

- Austria
- Belgium
- Bulgaria (350)
- Czechoslovakia
- Free City of Danzig
- Denmark
- Egypt
- Eretz Yisrael
- Estonia
- France
- Germany (134)
- Greece
- Hungary
- Italy
- Latvia
- Libya
- Lithuania
- Morocco
- Netherlands
- Poland
- Romania
- South Africa
- Syria
- Switzerland
- Turkey
- United Kingdom
- United States
- Yugoslavia

== Debuting countries ==
10 countries made their Maccabiah debut at these games.

- Belgium
- Estonia
- Hungary
- Italy
- Latvia
- Libya
- Morocco
- Netherlands
- Turkey
- South Africa
