= Manfred Magnus =

Austrian motorcycle racer

Manfred Magnus (born October 4, 1939 in Salzburg, Austria) is an Austrian former motorcycle racer. He was five times the Austrian motorcycle Champion.

== His life ==
Already as a young boy, Magnus took part in a soap box derby on the motorway at the Walserberg, near Salzburg towards the German border and on the hill of the pilgrimage church Maria Plain. In the age of 15 he got his first own moped, a Puch. This Puch-Moped was the fastest one in Salzburg according to his statement. Just one year older he got his driver's licence and took place at the Sollböck-Bergwertungsfahrt in Lower Austria (1956) with KTM-Tarzan. He won a gold medal. But in 1957, he started the first time a real motorcycle race at the int. motorcycle and automobile ice-race on the lake Zell am See and got second in the 125-ccm- class Skijöring behind the Salzburgian Paul Schwarz and Lechner (all with KTM). It followed a third place at the airport-race in Knittelfeld, Styria in the 125-ccm-class and second place in the 175-ccm-class.

The year 1958 started with an ice-race in Thiersee, Tyrol, which he finished in the 125-ccm-class as second behind the Tyrolean Franz Albert; but already in the 175-ccm-race at the same day he beat Albert and crossed the finish line as first.

Due to his study in West Germany, one saw Magnus first from 1961 on again as motorcycle racer. With his new acquired Paton 125 ccm he was the best Austrian racer in the Grand Prix of Austria in Salzburg on May 1. He finished this year with his first title being Austrian Motorcycle Champion in 125 ccm class. He repeated this title in 1963, 1964 and 1965 again, the last time he was Austrian Champion in 1970, but at that time in the 350-ccm-class.

Attempting to set new records, in 1963, Magnus was successful on the motorway near Salzburg, at Grödig/Anif. He rode the flying kilometre on a works-Honda 250 ccm in 16,42 seconds, that means 219,245 km/h, a record for the classes 125 ccm, 250 ccm und 350 ccm, which is even today valid.

== His results ==
Year	Mark	Race	Placements	Remark	Int.	Nat.
1956	KTM-Tarzan	Sollböck-hillclimb-competition	Gold	125 cm³		X
1957	MV-Agusta-KTM-works-racingmotorcycle	Int. Motorrad- und Auto-Eisrennen Zell am See	3.	125 cm³	X	
	MV-Agusta-KTM-works-racingmotorcycle	Skijöring Eisrennen Zell am See	2.	125 cm³	X	
	MV-Agusta-KTM-works-racingmotorcycle	Eisrennen Zell am See	4.	175 cm³	X	
	MV-Agusta-KTM-Werksrennmaschine	Flugplatzrennen Zeltweg	3.	125 cm³	X	
	MV-Agusta-KTM-works-racingmotorcycle	Flugplatzrennen Zeltweg	2.	175 cm³	X	
	MV-Agusta-KTM-works-racingmotorcycle	Flugplatzrennen Zeltweg	4.	250 cm³	X	
	MV-Agusta-KTM-works-racingmotorcycle	Wurzenpass-Bergrennen	2.	125 cm³	X	
1958	Mondial	Int. Thiersee Skijöring, Tyrol	1.	125 cm³	X	
	Mondial	Int. Thiersee Eisrennen, Tyrol	2.	125 cm³	X	
	KTM-works-trial-motorcycle	Eisenstädter Bergprüfung	Gold	125 cm³		X
	KTM-works-motocross-motorcycle	Moto Cross Linz	2.	125 cm³	X	
	KTM-works-trial-motorcycle	Sollböck-Bergwertung	Gold	125 cm³		X
1960	Paton	Flugplatzrennen Zeltweg	3.	125 cm³		X
	Paton	Rundstreckenrennen Laa an der Thaya	2.	125 cm³		X
1961	Paton	Platschbergrennen	2.	125 cm³		X
	Paton	Bergrennen Schauinsland, Freiburg, Germany	4.	125 cm³	X	
	Paton	Rundstreckenrennen Laa an der Thaya	1.	125 cm³		X
	Paton	Rundstreckenrennen Laa an der Thaya	4.	250 cm³		X
	Paton	Gschaidersattel-Bergrennen	4.	125 cm³		X
	Paton	Laxenburger Schlossparkrennen	4.	125 cm³	X	
1962	Paton	Platschbergrennen	1.	125 cm³		X
	Paton	Bourg-en-Bresse, France	4.	125 cm³	X	
	Paton	Rundstreckenrennen St. Pölten	1.	125 cm³		X
	Paton	GP of Albi, France	3.	125 cm³	X	
	Paton	Rundstreckenrennen Frohburg, GRD	5.	125 cm³	X	
	Paton	Rundstreckenrennen Dresden, GRD	6.	125 cm³	X	
1963	Honda CR 93	Bergrennen Deutschlandsberg	1.	125 cm³		X
	Honda CR 93	Nürburgring, Germany	7.	125 cm³	X	
	Honda CR 93	GP of Austria, Salzburg	8.	125 cm³	X	
	Honda CR 93	Platschbergrennen	1.	125 cm³	X	
	Ducati	Platschbergrennen	1.	175 cm³	X	
	Honda CR 93	Bergrennen Schauinsland, Freiburg, Germany	3.	125 cm³	X	
	Honda CR 93	GP of Germany, Hockenheim-Ring, World Championship Run	10.	125 cm³,	X	
	Honda CR 93	Rundstreckenrennen Skofja Loka, Yugoslavia	1.	125 cm³	X	
	Honda CR 93	Rundstreckenrennen Skofja Loka, Yugoslavia	1.	175 cm³	X	
	Honda CR 93	GP of Albi, France	3.	125 cm³	X	
	Honda CR 93	GP of Valladolid, Spain	3.	125 cm³	X	
	Honda CR 93	Race Jerez de la Frontera, Spain	3.	125 cm³	X	
	Honda CR 93	Laxenburger Schlossparkrennen	3.	125 cm³	X	
1964	Honda CR 93	Cervia, Italy	6.	125 cm³	X	
	Honda CR 93	Nürburgring, Germany	5.	125 cm³	X	
	Honda CR 93	GP of Austria, Salzburg	5.	125 cm³	X	
	Honda CR 93	GP of France, Clermont Ferrand, World Championship Run	9.	125 cm³	X	
	Honda CR 93	Rundstreckenrennen Skofja Loka, Yugoslavia	2.	125 cm³	X	
	Honda CR 93	Bergrennen Koralpe	3.	125 cm³	X	
	Honda CR 93	GP of Budapest, Hungary	2.	125 cm³	X	
	Honda CR 93	Bergrennen Braunsberg	1.	125 cm³		X
1965	Honda CR 93	GP of Stockholm, Sweden	1.	125 cm³	X	
	Honda CR 93	Rundstreckenrennen Jicin, CSSR	2.	125 cm³	X	
	Honda CR 93	Bergrennen Mont Ventoux, France	1.	125 cm³	X	
	Honda CR 93	Bergrennen Alpl	2.	125 cm³		X
	Honda CR 93	Bergrennen Ollon Villars, Switzerland	4.	125 cm³	X	
	Honda CR 93	Bergrennen Schauinsland, Freiburg, Germany	2.	125 cm³	X	
	Honda CR 93	Bergrennen Wiener Höhenstraße	2.	125 cm³	X	
	Honda CR 93	GP of Brno, CSSR, World Championship Run	10.	125 cm³, WM	X	
	Honda CR 93	Snetterton, Great Britain	6.	125 cm³	X	
	Honda CR 93	Pistany, CSSR	6.	125 cm³	X	
1966	Bultaco	Bergrennen Braunsberg	2.	250 cm³		X
	Honda CR 93	Großer Bergpreis von Österreich, Gaisbergrennen	2.	125 cm³		X
	Bultaco	Sonntagsberg	4.	350 cm³		X
1967	Puch-works-racer	Bergrennen Walding-Grammastetten	3.	125 cm³	X	
	Puch-works-racer	Stainzer Bergrennen	4.	125 cm³		X
	Puch-works-racer	Großer Bergpreis von Österreich, Gaisbergrennen	4.	125 cm³		X
1968	Puch-works-racer	Bergrennen Dobratsch	2.	125 cm³	X	
	Puch-works-racer	Bergrennen Koralpe	2.	125 cm³		X
	Puch-works-racer	Bergrennen Bichlbach-Berwang	1.	125 cm³	X	
	Puch-works-racer	Bergrennen Reinischkogel	2.	125 cm³		X
	Puch-works-racer	Bergrennen Gresten	1.	125 cm³		X
	Puch-works-racer	Bergrennen Walding-Grammastetten	1.	125 cm³	X	
	Puch-works-racer	Bergrennen Gmundnerberg	1.	125 cm³		X
	Puch-works-racer	Großer Bergpreis von Österreich, Gaisbergrennen	1.	125 cm³		X
	Puch-works-racer	Bergrennen Behamberg Steyr	1.	125 cm³		X
	Puch-works-racer	Bergrennen Aldrans	1.	125 cm³	X	
	Puch-works-racer	Bergrennen Bad Mühllacken	4.	125 cm³	X	
	Puch-works-racer	Bergrennen Dopplerhütte	2.	125 cm³	X	
	Puch-works-racer	Rundstreckenrennen Zistersdorf	4.	125 cm³	X	
	Puch-works-racer	Flugplatzrennen Langenlebarn	5.	125 cm³	X	
	Puch-works-racer	Bergrennen Tauplitz	4.	125 cm³	X	
1969	Yamaha TR2	Großer Bergpreis von Österreich, Gaisbergrennen	2.	350 cm³		X
	Yamaha TR2	Rundstreckenrennen „Festspielpreis“, Salzburgring	4.	350 cm³		X
	Yamaha TR2	Flugplatzrennen Innsbruck	1	350 cm³, Schnellster aller Klassen!		X
	Yamaha TR2	Rundstreckenrennen Salzburgring	2.	350 cm³	X	
	Yamaha TR2	Bergrennen Walding-Grammastetten	1.	350 cm³, Schnellster aller Klassen!	X	
1970	Yamaha TR2	Bergrennen Bad Mühllacken	1.	350 cm³	X	
	Yamaha TR2	Bergrennen Weerberg	1.	350 cm³	X	
	Yamaha TR2	GP of Austria, Salzburgring	4.	350 cm³	X	
	Yamaha TR2	Bergrennen Alpl	2.	350 cm³	X	
	Yamaha TR2	Bergrennen Behamberg	3.	350 cm³	X	
	Yamaha TR2	Rundstreckenrennen Salzburgring	2.	350 cm³	X	
	Yamaha TR2	Rundstreckenrennen Schwanenstadt	4.	350 cm³	X	
