= Helmut Riegler =

Austrian footballer

Personal information
- Date of birth: October 13, 1976 (age 50)
- Height: 1.78 m (5 ft 10 in)
- Position: Defender

Youth career
- Union Perg

Senior career*
Years	Team	Apps	(Gls)
?–1997	Union Perg		
1997–2004	SV Pasching		
2004–2005	LASK Linz		
2005–2006	Union Perg		
2006–2009	Union St. Florian		
2009–2010	SKU Amstetten		

International career
	Austria	1	(0)

Managerial career
- 2010–2012: SKU Amstetten (assistant)
- * Club domestic league appearances and goals

Helmut Riegler (born October 13, 1976) is an Austria international retired footballer who played for clubs including Union St. Florian.
