= Ruth Langer (swimmer) =

Austrian swimmer

Personal information
- Full name: Ruth Langer Lawrence
- Citizenship: Austrian
- Born: 21 May 1921 Vienna, Austria
- Died: 2 May 1999; 77 years old

Sport
- Sport: Swimming
- Events: freestyle, breaststroke
- Club: Hakoah Vienna

Achievements and titles
- National finals: Austrian 100m freestyle champion (1935); Austrian 400m freestyle champion (1935)
Medal record
Women's swimming
Representing Austria
Maccabiah Games
Bronze medal – third place	1935 Israel	200 m breaststroke

Ruth Langer, later known as Ruth Lawrence (21 May 1921 – 2 May 1999), was an Austrian swimmer who competed both nationally and internationally. Langer won several national titles, beginning at age 14 when she established the Austrian records for the 100m and 400m freestyle, and won the Austrian championship that year. She won a bronze medal at the 1935 Maccabiah Games in Mandatory Palestine, in the 200 m breaststroke. Selected for the Austrian Olympic Team, which was due to compete in the 1936 Summer Olympics in Nazi Germany, she refused to participate, as a protest against the Nazi regime in Germany and their antisemitism. In retaliation, Langer was banned for life by the Austrian Swimming Federation from competing in Austria. The lifetime ban was not lifted until 60 years later, at which time the Republic of Austria and the Austrian Swimming Federation officially apologized to her, and reinstated her titles and honors which they had repealed.

== Personal life ==
Langer was born in Vienna, Austria, to Wilhelm (a silk merchant) and Frimette Langer, and was Jewish. She had a younger brother, Alfred.

== Swimming career ==
=== Austria ===
Langer began swimming competitively at the age of 11. Her father brought her to coach Zsigo Wertheimer, who encouraged her to join the Hakoah Vienna swimming club, which had become the leading sports club in interwar Austria.

Langer won several national titles, beginning at age 14 when she established the Austrian records for the 100m and 400m freestyle, and won the Austrian championships at those distances that year.

She represented Austria in the 1935 Maccabiah Games in Mandatory Palestine, where she won a bronze medal in the 200 m breaststroke.

Langer was selected to compete in the 400m freestyle and the 4x100m freestyle relay for the Austrian Olympic Team, which was due to compete in the 1936 Summer Olympics in Nazi Germany. Antisemitism in Austria was strong, and the pools at which she and the other swimmers would engage in their final training had signs saying: "No entry for dogs and Jews." She refused to participate in the Games in Berlin, along with Austrian Jewish swimmers Judith Deutsch and Lucy Goldner, also members of Hakoach Vienna, as a protest against the Nazi regime in Germany and their antisemitism saying; "We do not boycott Olympia, but Berlin".

In retaliation, Langer and the other two girls were banned immediately by the Austrian Swimming Federation from competing in Austria for two years as a result of their refusal, and the Federation expunged the records of all Jewish victories, and removed the names of all Jewish swimmers from the Austrian record books. Later, after Austria was annexed by Nazi Germany, a lifetime ban was entered against her. After the annexation, Viennese athletes forced Langer to clean the SS and SA barracks.

Hakoah Vienna was dissolved in April 1938 along with all other Jewish sports clubs, its stadium was confiscated, and two Hakoah officials who happened to be there at the time were deported to Dachau concentration camp. At least 37 members of Hakoah Vienna were murdered in Nazi concentration camps.

The lifetime ban was not lifted until 1995. At that time the Republic of Austria and the Austrian Swimming Federation officially apologized to Langer, and reinstated her titles and honors which they had repealed 60 years earlier. Ruth and the two other women declined their invitations to go to Austria for the reinstatement ceremony.

== Later life ==
Langer escaped from Austria to Italy in June 1938, traveling to a swim meet in Milan, Italy, with false papers, dying her hair blonde, and identifying her as a Catholic. She stayed in Italy until September 1938.

She then went to England in 1939. She competed in, and won, the last Thames long-distance British championship race the same year. However, after the outbreak of World War Two, insasmuch as she held a German passport she was initially treated by the British as an "enemy alien", and transferred from London to Bath, Somerset. She was later allowed to return to London.

She married John Lawrence (formerly known as Hans Liebermann), whom she had known since she was a young child in Vienna, in 1943. They lived in London, and raised a son and daughter together.
