= Christoph Ebenbichler =

Austrian freestyle skier (born 1983)

Christoph Ebenbichler (born 2 December 1983) is an Austrian freestyle skier who specializes in the skicross discipline.

Ebenbichler made his World Cup debut in January 2006 in Kreischberg, and took his first World Cup points with a 23rd place in February 2007 in Les Contamines. He has since finished four times among the top twenty, his best result being a fifteenth place in January 2009 in Les Contamines.

He represents the sports club SC Mayrhofen.
