= Judith Haspel =

Israeli swimmer

Personal information
- Native name: יהודית דויטש-הספל
- Full name: Judith Deutch-Haspel, born Judith Deutch
- National team: Austria, but boycotted 1936 olympics
- Born: August 18, 1918 Vienna, Austria
- Died: November 20, 2004 (aged 86) Herzliya, Israel

Sport
- Sport: Swimming
- Strokes: Freestyle
- Club: Hakoah Vienna

Judith Deutsch-Haspel (born Judith Deutsch; Hebrew: יהודית דויטש-הספל; 18 August 1918 in Vienna – 20 November 2004 in Herzliya, Israel) was a swimming champion who held every Austrian women's middle and long distance freestyle record in 1935.

== Biography ==
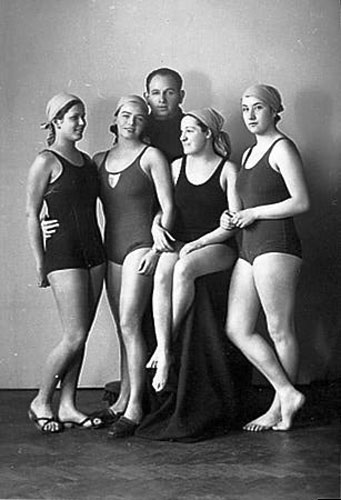
Hakoah Vienna swimmers and coach; from left: Judith Deutsch, Hedy Bienenfeld, Coach Zsigo Wertheimer, Fritzi Löwy, and Luci Goldner

As a Jewish child, Deutsch was prohibited from joining most athletic clubs in Austria so she began her competitive swimming at Hakoah Vienna, a Jewish athletic club where she was soon winning swim meets and setting national records.

Gaining national recognition, Deutsch was elected "Outstanding Austrian Female Athlete of 1935" by the Austrian Sports Authority.

In 1936, she was awarded Austria's "Golden Badge of Honor" as one of the country's top three athletes that year, and selected to represent her country in the 1936 Summer Olympics in Nazi Germany. Along with fellow swimmers Ruth Langer (1921 – 1999) and Lucie Goldner (1918 – 2000), she refused to compete at the Berlin Games in protest of Adolf Hitler, stating, "I refuse to enter a contest in a land which so shamefully persecutes my people." This angered Austrian sports authorities who banned her from competition. Her younger sister, Hanni Deutch Lux, who participated in the Berlin games and also swam for Hakoah, later said that during the opening ceremonies she and her Hakoah team members were greeted with "a silence filled with fear," and "felt mass hatred," concluding, "It really was one of my most horrible experiences."

When the Nazis later closed her swim club Hakoah around 1939 and forced its members to leave the country, Judith Deutsch emigrated to Palestine, where she competed in the Macabiah Games and became the Israeli national champion. After leaving Austria, the country's sporting authorities stripped her of her titles and expunged her name from the record books. Both Judith and her sister Hannah would live next door to each other after emigrating to Israel.

In 1995, the Austrian parliament apologized to Deutsch and reversed the sanctions imposed on her.

Haspel tells her story in Watermarks, a 2004 documentary film about the Hakoah Vienna women's swim team. The film noted that the legendary Hakoah team was the first to beat London's Women's Swim team at home.

At the age of 86, Judith Haspel died in Herzliya, Israel.

A street in Herzliya and a bridge in Vienna are named after her.

== See also ==
- List of select Jewish swimmers
