= Dieter Bartsch =

Austrian alpine skiing coach

Dieter Bartsch (1948) is an Austrian alpine skiing coach. He has been in the sport for over 50 years and has spent 40 years coaching athletes for the Alpine Skiing World Cup and ten Olympic games. He trained individual athletes as well as national teams.

== Career ==
In the 1970s Bartsch was nominated coach for the English Alpine National Team. He then coached the Swiss National Women's team, which included world top skiers such as Maria Walliser and Michela Figini. Later he coached the Austrian men's team for three years, and after this he worked with the Liechtenstein National team. In 1984 Bartsch was referee for alpine skiing at the Winter Olympics.

From the late 1980s until 1996 he served as head coach for the Norway National Team. During this period team Norway experienced improved success, with racers such as Atle Skårdal, Ole Kristian Furuseth, Lasse Kjus and Kjetil André Aamodt showing top performances in the world cup, championships and Olympics. He has later served as head coach for the Swiss National Team.

After working in Tennis with the ATP Tour, he returned to Alpine skiing as the race director for Head and Blizzard.
