= List of flag bearers for Portugal at the Olympics =

Portugal at the Olympics
- IOC code: POR
- NOC: Olympic Committee of Portugal
- Website: www.comiteolimpicoportugal.pt (in Portuguese)
- Medals: Gold 6 Silver 11 Bronze 15 Total 32

Summer appearances
- 1912; 1920; 1924; 1928; 1932; 1936; 1948; 1952; 1956; 1960; 1964; 1968; 1972; 1976; 1980; 1984; 1988; 1992; 1996; 2000; 2004; 2008; 2012; 2016; 2020; 2024

Winter appearances
- 1952; 1956–1984; 1988; 1992; 1994; 1998; 2002; 2006; 2010; 2014; 2018; 2022; 2026

This is a list of flag bearers who have represented Portugal at the Olympics.

Flag bearers carry the national flag of their country at the opening ceremony of the Olympic Games.

#	Year	Season	Flag bearer	Sport	Ref.
1	1912	Summer	Francisco Lázaro	Athletics	
2	1920	Summer	António de Menezes	Fencing	
3	1924	Summer	António Martins	Athletics/shooting	
4	1928	Summer			
5	1932	Summer			
6	1936	Summer	Fasette	Modern pentathlon (did not compete)	
7	1948	Summer	Joaquim Fiúza	Sailing	
8	1952	Winter	Duarte Silva	Alpine skiing	
9	1956	Summer	Bernardo Almeida	Sailing	
10	1960	Summer	Mário Quina	Sailing	
11	1964	Summer	Fernando Matos	Judo	
12	1968	Summer	José Manuel Quina	Sailing	
13	1972	Summer	Armando Aldegalega	Athletics	
14	1976	Summer	Carlos Lopes	Athletics	
15	1980	Summer	Esbela da Fonseca	Gymnastics (did not compete)	
16	1984	Summer	António Roquete	Judo	
17	1988	Winter	António Reis	Bobsleigh	
18	1988	Summer	João Rebelo	Shooting	
19	1992	Summer	Filipa Cavalleri	Judo	
20	1994	Winter	Georges Mendes	Alpine skiing	
21	1996	Summer	Fernanda Ribeiro	Athletics	
22	1998	Winter	Mafalda Pereira	Freestyle skiing	
23	2000	Summer	Miguel Maia	Beach volleyball	
24	2004	Summer	Nuno Delgado	Judo	
25	2006	Winter	Danny Silva	Cross-country skiing	
26	2008	Summer	Nelson Évora	Athletics	
27	2010	Winter	Danny Silva	Cross-country skiing	
28	2012	Summer	Telma Monteiro	Judo	
29	2014	Winter	Arthur Hanse	Alpine skiing	
30	2016	Summer	João Rodrigues	Sailing	
31	2018	Winter	Kequyen Lam	Cross-country skiing	
32	2020	Summer	Nelson Évora	Athletics	
32	2020	Summer	Telma Monteiro	Judo	
33	2022	Winter	Ricardo Brancal	Alpine skiing	
33	2022	Winter	Vanina Guerillot	Alpine skiing	
34	2024	Summer	Ana Cabecinha	Athletics	
34	2024	Summer	Fernando Pimenta	Canoeing	

== See also ==
- Portugal at the Olympics
