= Portugal at the 1988 Winter Olympics =

- IOC code: POR
- NOC: Olympic Committee of Portugal
- Website: www.comiteolimpicoportugal.pt (in Portuguese)

in Calgary
- Competitors: 5 in 1 sport
- Flag bearer: António Reis
- Officials: 1
- Medals: Gold 0 Silver 0 Bronze 0 Total 0

Winter Olympics appearances (overview)
- 1952; 1956–1984; 1988; 1992; 1994; 1998; 2002; 2006; 2010; 2014; 2018; 2022; 2026

Portugal competed at the 1988 Winter Olympics in Calgary, Canada. It was the first time in 36 years that the nation sent athletes to the Winter Games.

A delegation of five competitors participated in one sport - bobsleigh - but no medal was gained.

== Competitors ==
The following is the list of number of competitors in the Games.

Sport	Men	Women	Total
Bobsleigh	5	–	5
Total	5	0	5

== Bobsleigh ==
Athlete	Event	Run 1		Run 2		Run 3		Run 4		Total	
Athlete	Event	Time	Rank	Time	Rank	Time	Rank	Time	Rank	Time	Rank
Antonio Reis; João Poupada	Two-man	60.72	36	61.59	36	61.86	30	60.98	27	4:05.15	34
Jorge Magalhães; João Pires	Two-man	62.85	41	63.18	41	65.19	40	Did not start			
Antonio Reis; João Poupada; João Pires; Rogério Bernardes	Four-man	58.42	26	59.67	26	58.28	25	59.13	25	3:55.50	25

== Officials ==
- Vasco Lynce (chief of mission)
