= Bobsleigh at the 1988 Winter Olympics – Two-man =

Two-man at the XV Olympic Winter Games
- Venue: Canada Olympic Park
- Dates: February 20 – 21, 1988
- Competitors: 82 from 25 nations
- Winning time: 3:53.48

Medalists
1st place, gold medalist(s)		Soviet Union; Jānis Ķipurs, Vladimir Kozlov
2nd place, silver medalist(s)		East Germany; Wolfgang Hoppe, Bogdan Musioł
3rd place, bronze medalist(s)		East Germany; Bernhard Lehmann, Mario Hoyer

The Two-man bobsleigh competition at the 1988 Winter Olympics in Calgary was held on 20 and 21 February, at Canada Olympic Park.

== Results ==
Rank	Country	Athletes	Run 1	Run 2	Run 3	Run 4	Total
1st place, gold medalist(s)	Soviet Union (URS-1)	Jānis Ķipurs; Vladimir Kozlov	57.43	58.05	59.52	58.48	3:53.48
2nd place, silver medalist(s)	East Germany (GDR-1)	Wolfgang Hoppe; Bogdan Musioł	57.06	59.26	59.45	58.42	3:54.19
3rd place, bronze medalist(s)	East Germany (GDR-2)	Bernhard Lehmann; Mario Hoyer	57.65	58.67	59.59	58.73	3:54.64
4	Switzerland (SUI-2)	Gustav Weder; Donat Acklin	58.01	58.88	60.12	59.05	3:56.06
5	Austria (AUT-1)	Ingo Appelt; Harald Winkler	57.22	59.83	60.00	59.44	3:56.49
6	Switzerland (SUI-1)	Hans Hiltebrand; André Kisser	58.74	59.21	59.55	59.02	3:56.52
7	West Germany (FRG-1)	Anton Fischer; Christoph Langen	57.58	59.70	60.06	59.28	3:56.62
8	Austria (AUT-2)	Peter Kienast; Christian Mark	58.19	58.96	60.48	59.28	3:56.91
9	Soviet Union (URS-2)	Zintis Ekmanis; Aivars Trops	57.95	59.12	60.72	59.13	3:56.92
10	Canada (CAN-1)	Greg Haydenluck; Lloyd Guss	57.36	59.90	60.11	59.60	3:56.97
11	West Germany (FRG-2)	Michael Sperr; Rolf Müller	57.47	60.09	60.42	59.86	3:57.84
12	Great Britain (GBR-1)	Tom De La Hunty; Alec Leonce	57.83	59.77	60.91	59.50	3:58.01
13	Canada (CAN-2)	David Leuty; Kevin Tyler	58.56	59.08	60.55	60.00	3:58.19
14	Sweden (SWE-1)	Per-Anders Persson; Rolf Akerstrom	58.40	59.99	60.99	59.71	3:59.09
15	Chinese Taipei (TPE-1)	Chen Chin-san; Lee Chen-tan	57.83	60.22	60.99	60.07	3:59.11
16	United States (USA-2)	Matt Roy; Jim Herberich	59.35	60.06	60.34	59.57	3:59.32
17	Italy (ITA-1)	Alex Wolf; Georg Beikircher	59.35	59.65	60.32	60.03	3:59.35
18	Great Britain (GBR-2)	Mark Tout; David Armstrong	58.10	60.31	61.11	59.87	3:59.39
19	Italy (ITA-2)	Ivo Ferriano; Stefano Ticci	58.25	60.60	61.08	60.21	4:00.14
20	New Zealand (NZL-1)	Lex Peterson; Peter Henry	58.65	60.87	61.25	60.27	4:01.04
20	Japan (JPN-2)	Yuji Yaku; Toshio Wakita	58.57	60.58	61.51	60.38	4:01.04
22	Bulgaria (BUL-1)	Tsvetozar Viktorov; Aleksandar Simeonov	58.82	60.74	61.35	60.26	4:01.17
23	Australia (AUS-2)	Angus Stuart; Martin Harland	59.21	60.15	61.38	60.49	4:01.23
24	Romania (ROU-1)	Csaba Nagy Lakatos; Costel Petrariu	58.83	60.82	61.75	60.62	4:02.02
25	Monaco (MON-1)	Albert, Prince Grimaldi; Gilbert Bessi	58.48	60.93	61.64	61.42	4:02.47
26	Australia (AUS-1)	Adrian Di Piazza; Simon Dodd	60.03	60.94	61.23	60.41	4:02.61
27	Romania (ROU-2)	Dorin Degan; Grigore Anghel	58.85	61.00	61.81	61.14	4:02.80
28	Yugoslavia	Borislav Vujadinović; Miro Pandurević	59.63	60.70	62.28	60.89	4:03.50
29	Netherlands Antilles	Bart Carpentier Alting; Bart Drechsel	59.60	60.78	61.95	61.40	4:03.73
30	Jamaica	Dudley Stokes; Michael White	60.20	60.56	61.87	61.23	4:03.86
31	New Zealand (NZL-2)	Owen Pinnell; Blair Telford	60.37	60.95	61.62	61.22	4:04.16
32	Bulgaria (BUL-2)	Todor Todorov; Nikolay Botev	59.68	61.44	62.05	61.64	4:04.81
33	Chinese Taipei (TPE-2)	Sun Kuang-Ming; Chen Chin-Sen	59.25	61.54	62.26	62.01	4:05.06
34	Portugal (POR-1)	Antonio Reis; João Poupada	60.72	61.59	61.86	60.98	4:05.15
35	Virgin Islands (ISV-2)	Harvey Hook; Christopher Sharpless	61.05	62.70	63.42	61.92	4:09.09
36	Mexico (MEX-1)	Jorge Tamés; José Tamés	61.58	62.39	63.44	62.67	4:10.08
37	Mexico (MEX-2)	Roberto Tamés; Luis Adrián Tamés	61.56	61.84	63.76	62.93	4:10.09
38	Virgin Islands (ISV-1)	John Reeve; John Foster, Sr.	61.11	63.06	64.14	62.70	4:11.01
-	United States (USA-1)	Brent Rushlaw; Mike Aljoe	59.01	60.13	60.96	DNS	-
-	Portugal (POR-2)	Jorge Magalhães; João Pires	62.85	63.18	65.19	DNS	-
	Japan (JPN-1)	Takao Sakai; Naomi Takewaki	58.32	60.39	DSQ	-	-
