= Fernando Gomes (football administrator) =

Portuguese sports administrator (born 1952)

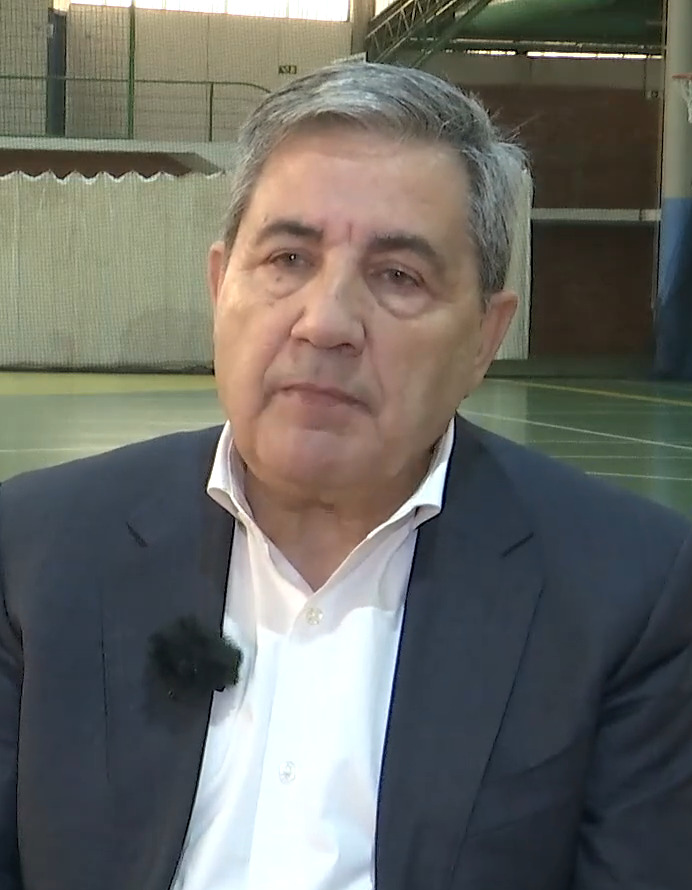
- Gomes in 2025

President of the Olympic Committee of Portugal
- Incumbent
- Assumed office 25 March 2025
- Preceded by: José Vicente de Moura

President of the Portuguese Football Federation
- In office 17 December 2011 – 18 February 2025
- Preceded by: Gilberto Madail
- Succeeded by: Pedro Proença

Personal details
- Born: Fernando Soares Gomes da Silva; 21 February 1952 (age 74) Porto, Portugal
- Occupation: Sports administrator

Fernando Soares Gomes da Silva (born 21 February 1952) is a Portuguese sports administrator. He has been a member of the FIFA Council since September 2017 and has served as President of the Olympic Committee of Portugal since 2025. He served as President of the Portuguese Football Federation from December 2011 to February 2025, and as a Vice-President of UEFA from 2017 to 2023.

He is a former basketball player and former league president, and he also had a long career at FC Porto, where he served on the board of directors from 2000 to 2010.

Gomes holds a degree in economics from the University of Porto.
