= Virgin Islands at the 1988 Winter Olympics =

- Flag of the United States Virgin Islands
- IOC code: ISV
- NOC: Virgin Islands Olympic Committee
- Website: www.virginislandsolympics.com

in Calgary
- Competitors: 6 (4 men, 2 women) in 3 sports
- Flag bearers: Seba Johnson, Alpine Skiing
- Medals: Gold 0 Silver 0 Bronze 0 Total 0

Winter Olympics appearances (overview)
- 1988; 1992; 1994; 1998; 2002; 2006; 2010; 2014; 2018; 2022; 2026

The United States Virgin Islands competed at the 1988 Winter Olympics in Calgary, Alberta, Canada. The nation debuted at the Winter Olympic Games.

== Competitors ==
The following is the list of number of competitors in the Games.

Sport	Men	Women	Total
Alpine skiing	1	1	2
Bobsleigh	4	–	4
Luge	0	1	1
Total	5	2	7

== Alpine skiing ==
Women

Athlete	Event	Race 1	Race 2	Total	
Athlete	Event	Time	Time	Time	Rank
Seba Johnson	Super-G			DSQ	–
Seba Johnson	Giant Slalom	1:19.27	1:29.94	2:49.21	28

== Bobsleigh ==
Sled	Athletes	Event	Run 1		Run 2		Run 3		Run 4		Total	
Sled	Athletes	Event	Time	Rank	Time	Rank	Time	Rank	Time	Rank	Time	Rank
ISV-1	John Reeve; John Foster	Two-man	1:01.11	38	1:03.06	40	1:04.14	39	1:02.70	37	4:11.01	38
ISV-2	Harvey Hook; Christopher Sharpless	Two-man	1:01.05	37	1:02.70	39	1:03.42	36	1:01.92	34	4:09.09	35

== Luge ==
Women

Athlete	Run 1		Run 2		Run 3		Run 4		Total	
Athlete	Time	Rank	Time	Rank	Time	Rank	Time	Rank	Time	Rank
Anne Abernathy	47.106	15	47.316	16	47.742	17	47.073	16	3:09.237	16
