= Åkerström =

Åkerström, sometimes written Akerstrom, is a Swedish surname. Notable people with the surname include:

- Åke Åkerström (1902–1991), Swedish archaeologist and classical scholar
- CajsaStina Åkerström (born 1967), Swedish singer, songwriter and author
- Fred Åkerström (1937–1985), Swedish musician
- Jan-Erik Åkerström (born 1935), Swedish bobsledder
- Lola Akinmade Åkerström, Nigerian photographer and travel writer
- Roger Åkerström (born 1967), Swedish ice hockey player
- Rolf Åkerström (born 1960), Swedish bobsledder
- Stig Åkerström (born 1953), Swedish footballer
- Ullie Akerstrom (1864–1941), American actress and playwright
