= Portugal at the 1998 Winter Olympics =

- IOC code: POR
- NOC: Olympic Committee of Portugal
- Website: www.comiteolimpicoportugal.pt (in Portuguese)

in Nagano
- Competitors: 2 in 2 sports
- Flag bearer: Mafalda Pereira
- Officials: 1
- Medals: Gold 0 Silver 0 Bronze 0 Total 0

Winter Olympics appearances (overview)
- 1952; 1956–1984; 1988; 1992; 1994; 1998; 2002; 2006; 2010; 2014; 2018; 2022; 2026

Portugal participated at the 1998 Winter Olympics in Nagano, Japan, held between 7 and 22 February 1998. The country's participation in the Games marked its third appearance at the Winter Olympics since its debut in the previous Games. The Portugal team consisted of two athletes who competed across two sports. Skier Mafalda Pereira served as the country's flag-bearer during the opening ceremony. Portugal did not win any medal in the Games, and has not won a Winter Olympics medal as of these Games.

== Background ==
The Olympic Committee of Portugal was formed on 28 October 1909 and the nation made its debut in the Olympics in the 1912 Summer Olympics. The 1952 Winter Olympics marked Portugal's first participation in the Winter Olympics. After the nation made its debut in the Winter Olympics at the 1952 Games, the nation did not participate in Winter Games till 1988. This edition of the Games in 1998 marked the nation's fourth appearance at the Winter Games.

The 1998 Winter Olympics was held in Nagano, Japan, held between 7 and 22 February 1998. The Portugal team consisted of two athletes who competed across two sports. Skier Mafalda Pereira served as the country's flag-bearer during the opening ceremony. Portugal did not win any medal in the Games, and has not won a Winter Olympics medal as of these Games.

== Competitors ==
Portugal sent two athletes who competed in two events across two sports at the Games.

Sport	Men	Women	Total
Freestyle skiing	0	1	1
Speed skating	1	0	1
Total	1	1	2

== Freestyle skiing ==
Freestyle skiing competitions were held between 16 and 18 February at Iizuna Kogen Resort. Mafalda Pereira represented Portugal at the sport in the women's category. This was the first and only Winter Games participation for Pereira. She finished 21st in the qualifying rounds of the women's aerials event and did not advance to the finals.

Athlete	Event	Qualifying		Final	
Athlete	Event	Points	Rank	Points	Rank
Mafalda Pereira	Women's aerials	118.86	21	Did not advance	

== Speed skating ==
Speed skating competitions were held at M-Wave in Nagano. Fausto Marreiros represented Portugal at the sport in the men's category. This was the first and only Winter Games participation for Marreriors. He finished 31st in the final classification of the men's 5000 m event.

Athlete	Event	Final	
Athlete	Event	Time	Rank
Fausto Marreiros	5000 m	7:01.87	31
