= Portugal at the 1994 Winter Olympics =

- IOC code: POR
- NOC: Olympic Committee of Portugal
- Website: www.comiteolimpicoportugal.pt (in Portuguese)

in Lillehammer
- Competitors: 1 in 1 sport
- Flag bearer: Jorge Mendes
- Medals: Gold 0 Silver 0 Bronze 0 Total 0

Winter Olympics appearances (overview)
- 1952; 1956–1984; 1988; 1992; 1994; 1998; 2002; 2006; 2010; 2014; 2018; 2022; 2026

Portugal was represented at the 1994 Winter Olympics in Lillehammer, Norway by the Olympic Committee of Portugal.

In total, one athlete (Jorge Mendes) represented Portugal in alpine skiing. No medals were won.

== Background ==
Portugal last competed at the winter Olympics in 1988 in Calgary, Alberta, Canada, when a record five Portuguese athletes took part. It was only their second appearance at the Winter Olympics after their debut appearance at the 1952 Games in Oslo, Norway. They did not compete at the 1992 Games in Albertville, France.

== Competitors ==
In total, one athlete represented Portugal at the 1994 Winter Olympics in Lillehammer, Norway, in one sport.

Sport	Men	Women	Total
Alpine skiing	1	0	1
Total	1	0	1

== Alpine skiing ==
One Portuguese athlete participated in the alpine skiing events – Jorge Mendes in the men's combined, downhill, super-G and giant slalom.

The alpine skiing events were held at Kvitfjell in Ringebu Municipality and Hafjell in Øyer Municipality. The slalom events were held at Hafjell and the downhill and super-G were held at Kvitfjell.

The men's downhill took place on 13 February 1994 at 11 am. Mendes completed the course in one minute 49.2 seconds to finish 41st overall.

The men's super-G took place on 17 February 1994 at 11 am. Mendes did not finish.

The men's giant slalom took place on 23 February 1994. Mendes completed his first run in one minute 35.94 seconds and his second run in one minute 29.26 seconds for a combined time of three minutes 5.2 seconds to finish 32nd overall.

The men's combined took place on 14 and 25 February 1994. The downhill runs took place on 14 February at 11 am and the two slalom runs took place on 25 February. Mendes completed his downhill run in one minute 40.29 seconds. However, he did not start the slalom runs.

Men

Athlete	Event	Run 1 (DH)		Run 2 (Sl)		Run 3 (Sl)		Final/total		
Athlete	Event	Time	Rank	Time	Rank	Time	Rank	Time	Diff	Rank
Jorge Mendes	Downhill	—N/a						1:49.20	+3.45	41
Jorge Mendes	Super-G	—N/a						Did not finish		
Jorge Mendes	Giant slalom	1:35.94	41	1:29.26	33	—N/a		3:05.20	+12.74	32
Jorge Mendes	Combined	1:40.29	30	Did not finish						
