= Portugal at the 2022 Winter Olympics =

- Flag of Portugal
- IOC code: POR
- NOC: Olympic Committee of Portugal
- Website: www.comiteolimpicoportugal.pt (in Portuguese)

in Beijing, China 4–20 February 2022
- Competitors: 3 (2 men and 1 woman) in 2 sports
- Flag bearers (opening): Ricardo Brancal; Vanina Guerillot
- Flag bearer (closing): Volunteer
- Medals: Gold 0 Silver 0 Bronze 0 Total 0

Winter Olympics appearances (overview)
- 1952; 1956–1984; 1988; 1992; 1994; 1998; 2002; 2006; 2010; 2014; 2018; 2022; 2026

Portugal competed at the 2022 Winter Olympics in Beijing, China, from 4 to 20 February 2022.

The Portuguese team consisted of three athletes (two men and one woman) competing in two sports. Ricardo Brancal and Vanina Guerillot were the country's flagbearer during the opening ceremony. Meanwhile, a volunteer was the flagbearer during the closing ceremony.

== Competitors ==
The following is the list of number of competitors participating at the Games per sport/discipline.

Sport	Men	Women	Total
Alpine skiing	1	1	2
Cross-country skiing	1	0	1
Total	2	1	3

== Alpine skiing ==
By meeting the basic qualification standards Portugal qualified one male and one female alpine skier.

Athlete	Event	Run 1		Run 2		Total	
Athlete	Event	Time	Rank	Time	Rank	Time	Rank
Ricardo Brancal	Men's giant slalom	1:16.83	42	1:20.57	36	2:37.40	37
Ricardo Brancal	Men's slalom	1:06.24	46	1:00.07	38	2:06.31	39
Vanina Guerillot	Women's giant slalom	1:10.59	56	1:06.33	39	2:16.92	43
Vanina Guerillot	Women's slalom	59.45	46	DNF			

== Cross-country skiing ==
By meeting the basic qualification standards Portugal qualified one male cross-country skier.

Distance

Athlete	Event	Final		
Athlete	Event	Time	Deficit	Rank
José Cabeça	Men's 15 km classical	49:12.0	+11:17.2	88
