= Portugal at the Olympics =

- IOC code: POR
- NOC: Olympic Committee of Portugal
- Website: www.comiteolimpicoportugal.pt (in Portuguese)
- Medals Ranked 68th: Gold 6 Silver 11 Bronze 15 Total 32

Summer appearances
- 1912; 1920; 1924; 1928; 1932; 1936; 1948; 1952; 1956; 1960; 1964; 1968; 1972; 1976; 1980; 1984; 1988; 1992; 1996; 2000; 2004; 2008; 2012; 2016; 2020; 2024

Winter appearances
- 1952; 1956–1984; 1988; 1992; 1994; 1998; 2002; 2006; 2010; 2014; 2018; 2022; 2026

Portugal first participated at the Olympic Games in 1912, and has sent athletes to compete in every Summer Olympic Games since then. Earlier that year, the Olympic Committee of Portugal (COP, Comité Olímpico de Portugal) was recognised by the International Olympic Committee as the Portuguese National Olympic Committee. In 1952, Portugal competed for the first time at the Winter Olympic Games, and appeared again 36 years later in 1988 to compete since then.

As of the 2024 Summer Olympics, forty two Portuguese athletes have won a total of thirty-two medals (six golds, eleven silvers and fifteen bronzes) in nine summer sports. Athletics has provided the most medals, including five golds. Portugal has not yet won any medal at the Winter Olympics.

== Medal tables ==
=== Medals by Summer Games ===
Games	Athletes	Gold	Silver	Bronze	Total	Rank
(Sweden) 1912 Stockholm	6	0	0	0	0	–
(Belgium) 1920 Antwerp	13	0	0	0	0	–
(France) 1924 Paris	30	0	0	1	1	23
(Netherlands) 1928 Amsterdam	31	0	0	1	1	32
(United States) 1932 Los Angeles	6	0	0	0	0	–
(Nazi Germany) 1936 Berlin	19	0	0	1	1	30
(United Kingdom) 1948 London	48	0	1	1	2	26
(Finland) 1952 Helsinki	71	0	0	1	1	40
(Australia) 1956 Melbourne	11	0	0	0	0	–
(Italy) 1960 Rome	65	0	1	0	1	32
(Japan) 1964 Tokyo	20	0	0	0	0	–
1968 Mexico City	20	0	0	0	0	–
(West Germany) 1972 Munich	31	0	0	0	0	–
(Canada) 1976 Montreal	19	0	2	0	2	30
(Soviet Union) 1980 Moscow	11	0	0	0	0	–
(United States) 1984 Los Angeles	38	1	0	2	3	23
(South Korea) 1988 Seoul	65	1	0	0	1	29
(Spain) 1992 Barcelona	90	0	0	0	0	–
(United States) 1996 Atlanta	107	1	0	1	2	47
(Australia) 2000 Sydney	61	0	0	2	2	69
(Greece) 2004 Athens	81	0	2	1	3	60
(China) 2008 Beijing	77	1	1	0	2	47
(United Kingdom) 2012 London	77	0	1	0	1	69
(Brazil) 2016 Rio de Janeiro	92	0	0	1	1	78
(Japan) 2020 Tokyo	92	1	1	2	4	56
(France) 2024 Paris	73	1	2	1	4	50
(United States) 2028 Los Angeles	future event					
(Australia) 2032 Brisbane	future event					
Total		6	11	15	32	68

=== Medals by Winter Games ===
Games	Athletes	Gold	Silver	Bronze	Total	Rank
(Norway) 1952 Oslo	1	0	0	0	0	–
1956–1984	did not participate					
(Canada) 1988 Calgary	5	0	0	0	0	–
(France) 1992 Albertville	did not participate					
(Norway) 1994 Lillehammer	1	0	0	0	0	–
(Japan) 1998 Nagano	2	0	0	0	0	–
(United States) 2002 Salt Lake City	did not participate					
(Italy) 2006 Turin	1	0	0	0	0	–
(Canada) 2010 Vancouver	1	0	0	0	0	–
(Russia) 2014 Sochi	2	0	0	0	0	–
(South Korea) 2018 Pyeongchang	2	0	0	0	0	–
(China) 2022 Beijing	3	0	0	0	0	–
(Italy) 2026 Milano Cortina	3	0	0	0	0	–
(France) 2030 French Alps	future event					
(United States) 2034 Utah	future event					
Total		0	0	0	0	–

=== Medals by summer sport ===
Sports	Gold	Silver	Bronze	Total	Rank
Athletics	5	4	4	13	37
Cycling	1	2	0	3	29
Sailing	0	2	2	4	34
Canoeing	0	1	1	2	38
Triathlon	0	1	0	1	12
Shooting	0	1	0	1	63
Judo	0	0	4	4	49
Equestrian	0	0	3	3	29
Fencing	0	0	1	1	38
Total	6	11	15	32	68

=== Medals by Gender ===
Gender	Gold	Silver	Bronze	Total
Men	4	9	8	21
Women	2	2	4	8
Mixed	0	0	3	3
Total	6	11	15	32

== List of medalists ==
A total of 42 athletes have won 32 medals for Portugal. Seven athletes have won more than one medal: Luís Mena e Silva (two bronzes), Carlos Lopes (one gold and one silver), Rosa Mota (one gold and one bronze), Fernanda Ribeiro (one gold and one bronze), Fernando Pimenta (one silver and one bronze), Pedro Pichardo (one gold and one silver), and Iúri Leitão (one gold and one silver).

Medal	Name	Games	Sport	Event
Bronze	António Borges; Hélder de Souza; José Mouzinho	(France) 1924 Paris	Equestrian	Team jumping
Bronze	Frederico Paredes; Henrique da Silveira; João Sassetti; Jorge de Paiva; Mário de Noronha; Paulo d'Eça Leal	(Netherlands) 1928 Amsterdam	Fencing	Men's team épée
Bronze	Domingos de Sousa; José Beltrão; Luís Mena e Silva	(Nazi Germany) 1936 Berlin	Equestrian	Team jumping
Silver	Duarte Bello; Fernando Bello	(United Kingdom) 1948 London	Sailing	Swallow
Bronze	Fernando Paes; Francisco Valadas; Luís Mena e Silva	(United Kingdom) 1948 London	Equestrian	Team dressage
Bronze	Joaquim Fiúza; Francisco de Andrade	(Finland) 1952 Helsinki	Sailing	Star
Silver	Mário Quina; José Quina	(Italy) 1960 Rome	Sailing	Star
Silver	Armando Marques	(Canada) 1976 Montreal	Shooting	Mixed trap
Silver	Carlos Lopes	(Canada) 1976 Montreal	Athletics	Men's 10000 m
Gold	Carlos Lopes	(United States) 1984 Los Angeles	Athletics	Men's marathon
Bronze	Rosa Mota	(United States) 1984 Los Angeles	Athletics	Women's marathon
Bronze	António Leitão	(United States) 1984 Los Angeles	Athletics	Men's 5000 m
Gold	Rosa Mota	(South Korea) 1988 Seoul	Athletics	Women's marathon
Gold	Fernanda Ribeiro	(United States) 1996 Atlanta	Athletics	Women's 10000 m
Bronze	Hugo Rocha; Nuno Barreto	(United States) 1996 Atlanta	Sailing	Men's 470
Bronze	Nuno Delgado	(Australia) 2000 Sydney	Judo	Men's 81 kg
Bronze	Fernanda Ribeiro	(Australia) 2000 Sydney	Athletics	Women's 10000 m
Silver	Sérgio Paulinho	(Greece) 2004 Athens	Cycling	Men's road race
Silver	Francis Obikwelu	(Greece) 2004 Athens	Athletics	Men's 100 m
Bronze	Rui Silva	(Greece) 2004 Athens	Athletics	Men's 1500 m
Gold	Nelson Évora	(China) 2008 Beijing	Athletics	Men's triple jump
Silver	Vanessa Fernandes	(China) 2008 Beijing	Triathlon	Women's competition
Silver	Fernando Pimenta; Emanuel Silva	(United Kingdom) 2012 London	Canoeing	Men's K-2 1000 m
Bronze	Telma Monteiro	(Brazil) 2016 Rio de Janeiro	Judo	Women's 57 kg
Gold	Pedro Pichardo	(Japan) 2020 Tokyo	Athletics	Men's triple jump
Silver	Patrícia Mamona	(Japan) 2020 Tokyo	Athletics	Women's triple jump
Bronze	Jorge Fonseca	(Japan) 2020 Tokyo	Judo	Men's 100 kg
Bronze	Fernando Pimenta	(Japan) 2020 Tokyo	Canoeing	Men's K-1 1000 m
Gold	Iúri Leitão; Rui Oliveira	(France) 2024 Paris	Cycling	Men's Madison
Silver	Iúri Leitão	(France) 2024 Paris	Cycling	Men's omnium
Silver	Pedro Pichardo	(France) 2024 Paris	Athletics	Men's triple jump
Bronze	Patrícia Sampaio	(France) 2024 Paris	Judo	Women's 78 kg

== Portuguese athletes with Olympic medals ==
No.	Athlete	Sport	Gender	Gold	Silver	Bronze	Total	Birth Year
1	Carlos Lopes	Athletics	M	1	1	0	2	1947
1	Pedro Pichardo	Athletics	M	1	1	0	2	1993
1	Iúri Leitão	Cycling	M	1	1	0	2	1998
2	Rosa Mota	Athletics	F	1	0	1	2	1958
2	Fernanda Ribeiro	Athletics	F	1	0	1	2	1969
3	Nelson Évora	Athletics	M	1	0	0	1	1984
3	Rui Oliveira	Cycling	M	1	0	0	1	1996
4	Fernando Pimenta	Canoeing	M	0	1	1	2	1989
5	Duarte Bello	Sailing	M	0	1	0	1	
5	Fernando Bello	Sailing	M	0	1	0	1	
5	Mário Quina	Sailing	M	0	1	0	1	
5	José Quina	Sailing	M	0	1	0	1	
5	Armando Marques	Shooting	M	0	1	0	1	
5	Sérgio Paulinho	Cycling	M	0	1	0	1	1980
5	Francis Obikwelu	Athletics	M	0	1	0	1	1978
5	Vanessa Fernandes	Triathlon	F	0	1	0	1	1985
5	Emanuel Silva	Canoeing	M	0	1	0	1	1985
5	Patrícia Mamona	Athletics	F	0	1	0	1	1988
6	Luís Mena e Silva	Equestrian	M	0	0	2	2	
7	António Borges	Equestrian	M	0	0	1	1	
7	Hélder de Souza	Equestrian	M	0	0	1	1	
7	José Mouzinho	Equestrian	M	0	0	1	1	
7	Frederico Paredes	Fencing	M	0	0	1	1	
7	Henrique da Silveira	Fencing	M	0	0	1	1	
7	João Sassetti	Fencing	M	0	0	1	1	
7	Jorge de Paiva	Fencing	M	0	0	1	1	
7	Mário de Noronha	Fencing	M	0	0	1	1	
7	Paulo d'Eça Leal	Fencing	M	0	0	1	1	
7	Domingos de Sousa	Equestrian	M	0	0	1	1	
7	José Beltrão	Equestrian	M	0	0	1	1	
7	Fernando Paes	Equestrian	M	0	0	1	1	
7	Francisco Valadas	Equestrian	M	0	0	1	1	
7	Joaquim Fiúza	Sailing	M	0	0	1	1	
7	António Leitão	Athletics	M	0	0	1	1	1960
7	Hugo Rocha	Sailing	M	0	0	1	1	1972
7	Nuno Barreto	Sailing	M	0	0	1	1	1972
7	Nuno Delgado	Judo	M	0	0	1	1	1976
7	Rui Silva	Athletics	M	0	0	1	1	1977
7	Telma Monteiro	Judo	F	0	0	1	1	1985
7	Jorge Fonseca	Judo	M	0	0	1	1	1992
7	Patrícia Sampaio	Judo	F	0	0	1	1	1999

== See also ==
- List of flag bearers for Portugal at the Olympics
- Portugal at the Paralympics
- Sport in Portugal
