= Nobre Guedes Olympic Medal =

The Olympic Medal Nobre Guedes (Portuguese: Medalha Olímpica Nobre Guedes) is the most prestigious annual award given by the Olympic Committee of Portugal (COP) to still-active Portuguese sportspeople which stood out for their sporting results and achievements in the previous year. It is named in honour of the former COP president Francisco Nobre Guedes (1957–1968) and has been awarded uninterruptedly since 1951.

== List of decorated personalities ==
So far, 67 sports personalities have been decorated with this award. Below is a full list.

Year	Name	Sport
1951	Duarte Bello	Sailing
1952	Rogério Tavares	Shooting
1953	António José Conde Martins	Sailing
1954	Henrique Calado	Equestrian
1955	José Manuel da Costa Pereira	Handball
1956	Joaquim Mascarenhas Fiuza	Sailing
1957	Manuel Faria	Athletics
1958	Regina Veloso	Swimming
1959	Dália Cunha Sammer	Gymnastics
1960	Mário Gentil Quina	Sailing
1961	Orlando Azinhais	Fencing
1962	Pedro de Almeida	Athletics
1963	Vitor Manuel Ferreira Fonseca	Swimming
1964	Guy de Valle Flor Brito Chaves	Shooting
1965	António Pimenta da Gama	Equestrian
1966	Manuel Figueiredo de Oliveira	Swimming
1967	Dulce Gouveia	Swimming
1968	José Filipe Abreu	Gymnastics
1969	Susana Abreu	Swimming
1970	Luís Grilo	Wrestling
1971	José Manuel Costa Pedro	Weightlifting
1972	Maria Manuela Contreiras	Gymnastics
1973	Carlos Lopes	Athletics
1974	Armando Marques	Shooting
1974	Hugo d'Assumpção	Judo
1975	José Galvão	Athletics
1975	Rui Manuel Duarte Silva	Wrestling
1976	Maria Avelina Alvarez	Gymnastics
1977	Rui Abreu	Swimming
1977	Hugo d'Assumpção	Judo
1977	Joaquim Vieira	Wrestling
1978	José Luís Abreu de Almeida	Basketball
1979	Raul Correia Dinis	Weightlifting
1980	Alexandre Yokochi	Swimming
1980	Péricles Pinto	Athletics
1981	Rosa Mota	Athletics
1982	Francisco Coelho	Weightlifting
1983	Maria João Falcão	Gymnastics
1983	Luís Barroso	Athletics
1984	José Pinto	Athletics
1985	Mário Rua	Shooting
1986	Ana Sousa	Archery
1987	Luís Ramos	Shooting
1988	José Garcia	Canoeing
1989	Bernardo Marques Pinto	Rugby
1990	Mário Silva	Athletics
1991	Vitor Hugo	Roller hockey
1991	Manuel Barroso	Modern pentathlon
1992	Jorge Pereira	Trampoline
1993	Albertina Dias	Athletics
1994	Fernanda Ribeiro	Athletics
1995	Manuela Machado	Athletics
1995	João Rodrigues	Sailing
1996	Hugo Rocha / Nuno Barreto	Sailing
1997	Carla Sacramento	Athletics
1997	Ticha Penicheiro	Basketball
1998	António Pinto	Athletics
1999	Paulo Guerra	Athletics
1999	Nuno Delgado	Judo
2000	Michel Almeida	Judo
2001	Carlos Calado	Athletics
2001	Catarina Rodrigues	Judo
2002	Pedro Soares	Judo
2003	Gustavo Lima	Sailing
2004	Francis Obikwelu	Athletics
2005	Telma Monteiro	Judo
2006	Joaquim Videira	Fencing
2006	Naide Gomes	Athletics
2007	Vanessa Fernandes	Triathlon
2007	Nelson Évora	Athletics

== Awards by sport ==
Rank	Sport	No.
1	Athletics	19
2	Judo	7
–	Sailing	7
4	Gymnastics	6
–	Swimming	6
5	Shooting	5
6	Weightlifting	3
–	Wrestling	3
8	Basketball	2
–	Equestrian	2
–	Fencing	2
11	Archery	1
–	Canoeing	1
–	Handball	1
–	Modern pentathlon	1
–	Roller hockey	1
–	Rugby union	1
–	Triathlon	1
