= Portugal at the 1952 Winter Olympics =

- IOC code: POR
- NOC: Olympic Committee of Portugal
- Website: Official Site (in Portuguese)

in Oslo
- Competitors: 1 in 1 sport
- Flag bearer: Duarte Silva
- Medals: Gold 0 Silver 0 Bronze 0 Total 0

Winter Olympics appearances (overview)
- 1952; 1956–1984; 1988; 1992; 1994; 1998; 2002; 2006; 2010; 2014; 2018; 2022; 2026

Portugal sent a delegation to compete in the 1952 Winter Olympics in Oslo, Norway from 15 to 25 February 1952. This was the nation's first time participating in the Winter Olympic Games, and it would be 36 years before they competed in the Winter Olympics again. Portugal was represented in Oslo by a single alpine skier, Duarte Silva. In his only event, the men's downhill, he came in 69th place.

== Background ==
The Olympic Committee of Portugal was recognised by the International Olympic Committee on 1 January 1909. The nation first joined Olympic competition at the following Summer Olympic Games, the 1912 Stockholm Olympics, and they have participated in every Summer Olympiad since. Despite this, they did not enter the Winter Olympic Games for the first time until these Oslo Games, and it would be 36 years until the nation would return to the Winter Olympics, at the 1988 Calgary Olympics. The 1952 Winter Olympics were held in Oslo, Norway from 14 to 25 February 1952; a total of 694 athletes representing 30 National Olympic Committees took part. Portugal was represented in Oslo by a single alpine skier, Duarte Silva, who was selected as the flag-bearer for the opening ceremony.

== Alpine skiing ==
Duarte Silva was 27 years old at the time of the Oslo Olympics, and was making his only Olympic appearance. On 16 February, he participated in the men's downhill race, which was held over a single run of the course. Silva finished the race in 3 minutes and 58.4 seconds, which put him in 69th place out of 74 competitors who completed the event. The gold medal was won by Zeno Colò of Italy in 2 minutes and 30.8 seconds, 87 seconds faster than Silva's time. The silver and bronze medals were both won by Austrians, Othmar Schneider and Christian Pravda, respectively.

Athlete	Event	Final/Total		
Athlete	Event	Time	Diff	Rank
Duarte Silva	Men's downhill	3:58.4	+87.6	69

== See also ==
- Portugal at the 1952 Summer Olympics
