= Portugal at the 2010 Winter Olympics =

- IOC code: POR
- NOC: Olympic Committee of Portugal
- Website: www.comiteolimpicoportugal.pt (in Portuguese)

in Vancouver
- Competitors: 1 in 1 sport
- Flag bearer: Danny Silva
- Medals: Gold 0 Silver 0 Bronze 0 Total 0

Winter Olympics appearances (overview)
- 1952; 1956–1984; 1988; 1992; 1994; 1998; 2002; 2006; 2010; 2014; 2018; 2022; 2026

Portugal sent a delegation to compete at the 2010 Winter Olympics in Vancouver, Canada from 12 to 28 February 2010. This was the nation's sixth appearance at a Winter Olympic Games. The Portuguese delegation consisted of a single cross-country skiing competitor, Danny Silva. He placed 95th in the 15 kilometre freestyle race.

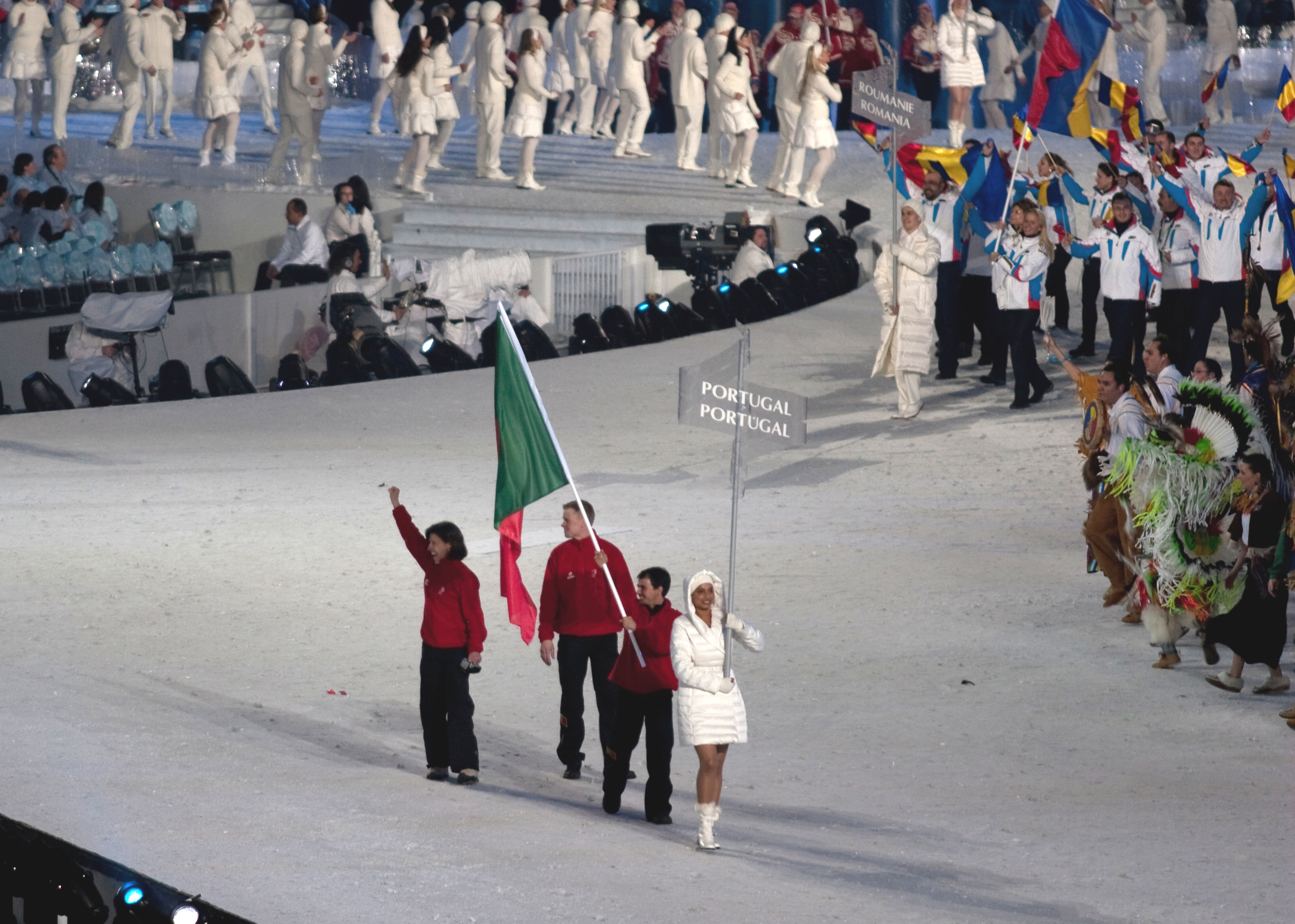
The delegation entering the stadium during the opening ceremonies.

== Background ==
Portugal debuted in Olympic competition at the 1912 Stockholm Olympics, and have appeared in every Summer Olympics since. The nation made its first appearance in a Winter Olympic Games in 1952. Since then, their attendance has been sporadic, with the country making its second appearance in the 1988 Winter Games. They participated in 1994, 1998, and 2006, but skipped the 1992 and 2002 editions. The delegation sent by Portugal to Vancouver consisted of a single athlete, the cross-country skiing competitor Danny Silva. He was chosen as the flag bearer for both the opening ceremony and the closing ceremony.

== Cross-country skiing ==
Danny Silva was 36 years old at the time of the Vancouver Olympics. He had previously represented Portugal at the 2006 Winter Olympics. His only event was the 15 kilometre freestyle, held on 15 February. He finished with a time of 49 minutes and 31 seconds, nearly 16 minutes behind the gold medallist. This time put him in 95th and last place of the competitors who took part in the race.

Athlete	Event	Final		
Athlete	Event	Time	Deficit	Rank
Danny Silva	15 kilometre freestyle	49:31.4	15:55.1	95

== See also ==
- Portugal at the 2010 Summer Youth Olympics
