= Portugal at the 2026 Winter Olympics =

- Flag of Portugal
- IOC code: POR
- NOC: Olympic Committee of Portugal
- Website: www.comiteolimpicoportugal.pt (in Portuguese)

in Milan and Cortina d'Ampezzo, Italy 6 February 2026 – 22 February 2026
- Competitors: 3 (2 men and 1 woman) in 2 sports
- Flag bearers (opening): José Cabeça & Vanina Guerillot
- Flag bearer (closing): José Cabeça
- Medals: Gold 0 Silver 0 Bronze 0 Total 0

Winter Olympics appearances (overview)
- 1952; 1956–1984; 1988; 1992; 1994; 1998; 2002; 2006; 2010; 2014; 2018; 2022; 2026

Portugal competed at the 2026 Winter Olympics in Milan and Cortina d'Ampezzo, Italy, from 6 to 22 February 2026.

José Cabeça and Vanina Guerillot were the country's flagbearer during the opening ceremony. Meanwhile, Cabeça was the country's flagbearer during the closing ceremony.

== Competitors ==
The following is the list of number of competitors participating at the Games per sport/discipline.

Sport	Men	Women	Total
Alpine skiing	1	1	2
Cross-country skiing	1	0	1
Total	2	1	3

== Alpine skiing ==
Portugal qualified one female and one male alpine skier through the basic quota.

Athlete	Event	Run 1		Run 2		Total	
Athlete	Event	Time	Rank	Time	Rank	Time	Rank
Emeric Guerillot	Men's giant slalom	1:22.87	42	1:16.58	37	2:39.45	38
Emeric Guerillot	Men's slalom	DNF					
Emeric Guerillot	Men's super-G	—N/a				1:31.43	32
Vanina Guerillot	Women's giant slalom	1:10.07	47	1:15.49	40	2:25.56	41
Vanina Guerillot	Women's slalom	53.48	52	1:01.66	47	1:55.14	45

== Cross-country skiing ==
Portugal qualified one male cross-country skier through the basic quota.

Distance

Athlete	Event	Final		
Athlete	Event	Time	Deficit	Rank
José Cabeça	Men's 10 km freestyle	27:00.8	+6:24.6	99

Sprint

Athlete	Event	Qualification		Quarterfinal		Semifinal		Final	
Athlete	Event	Time	Rank	Time	Rank	Time	Rank	Time	Rank
José Cabeça	Men's sprint	4:02.77	91	Did not advance					

== See also ==
- Portugal at the 2026 Winter Paralympics
