= Portugal at the 2018 Winter Olympics =

- Flag of Portugal
- IOC code: POR
- NOC: Olympic Committee of Portugal
- Website: www.comiteolimpicoportugal.pt (in Portuguese)

in Pyeongchang, South Korea 9–25 February 2018
- Competitors: 2 (2 men) in 2 sports
- Flag bearer: Kequyen Lam
- Medals: Gold 0 Silver 0 Bronze 0 Total 0

Winter Olympics appearances (overview)
- 1952; 1956–1984; 1988; 1992; 1994; 1998; 2002; 2006; 2010; 2014; 2018; 2022; 2026

Portugal competed at the 2018 Winter Olympics in Pyeongchang, South Korea, from 9 to 25 February 2018. Portugal's team consisted of two male athletes competing across two sports.

== Competitors ==
The following is the list of number of competitors participating in the Portuguese delegation per sport.

Sport	Men	Women	Total
Alpine skiing	1	0	1
Cross-country skiing	1	0	1
Total	2	0	2

== Alpine skiing ==
Portugal qualified one male athlete.

Athlete	Event	Run 1		Run 2		Total	
Athlete	Event	Time	Rank	Time	Rank	Time	Rank
Arthur Hanse	Men's slalom	58.26	46	1:00.35	38	1:58.61	38
Arthur Hanse	Men's giant slalom	1:22.43	76	1:21.52	67	2:43.95	66

== Cross-country skiing ==
Portugal qualified one male athlete. Lam is Canadian-Portuguese and was born in Macau, at the time under the control of Portugal giving him Portuguese citizenship. Lam grew up in Canada from an early age, and pursued competing for Canada in snowboarding until 2013 when he suffered an injury. Lam switched to cross-country skiing and competing for Portugal in 2015, in the hopes of competing at the Winter Olympics.

Distance

Athlete	Event	Final		
Athlete	Event	Time	Deficit	Rank
Kequyen Lam	Men's 15 km freestyle	54:34.1	+20:50.2	113

== See also ==
- Portugal at the 2018 Summer Youth Olympics
