= Fernando Lima Bello =

Portuguese sailor (1931–2021)

Fernando Lima Bello (27 November 1931 – 3 June 2021) was Portugal's only member of the International Olympic Committee since 1989, when he ended his term at the presidency of the Olympic Committee of Portugal.

Bello was born in Lisbon. He was a civil engineering alumnus of the University of Lisbon, the director of a road construction company, a member of the Registration Committee for Public Works Contractors, Director of the Regional Association of Contractors and Constructors and Director of the Construction Department, Ministry of Employment.

Lima Bello died in Lisbon, on 3 June 2021.

== Sailing ==
In 1953, he won, as a crew of Antonio José Conde Martins, the Snipe class world championship, and won a silver medal at the Star European Championship.

He was Portuguese national champion in Star, Dragon and 12 m2 Sharpie.

=== Olympic Games ===
He participated in the Olympic Games in Acapulco 1968 and Munich 1972 in Dragon.

== Sports administrator ==
He was chairman of the Portuguese Sailing Federation and its technical committee; sailing inspector for the Portuguese Youth Organization; member of the International Sailing Federation (ISAF); chairman of the Jury of the World Sailing Championships (Finn, 420, Cadet); member of the NOC (1975-), of its executive board (1977–1980) then chairman (1981–1989); during his tenure the Olympic Academy of Portugal was founded; chef de mission at the Games of the XXII Olympiad in Moscow in 1980; member of the Higher Sports Council and of the Sports Council for High Level Competition.

=== IOC ===
Member of the IOC from 1989 to 2010; honorary member since 2010; member of the following commissions: Cultural (1985–1999), International Olympic Academy and Olympic Education (1990–1999), Eligibility (1992–1993), Evaluation for the Games of the XXVIII Olympiad in 2004 (1996), Culture and Olympic Education (2000-); commissioner of the IOC at the Universal Exhibition in Lisbon (1998).

== Awards and distinctions ==
Olympic Order (2009); Portugal Sports Merit collar; Order Infante D. Henrique, Portugal
