= Seba Johnson =

Olympic skier (born 1973)

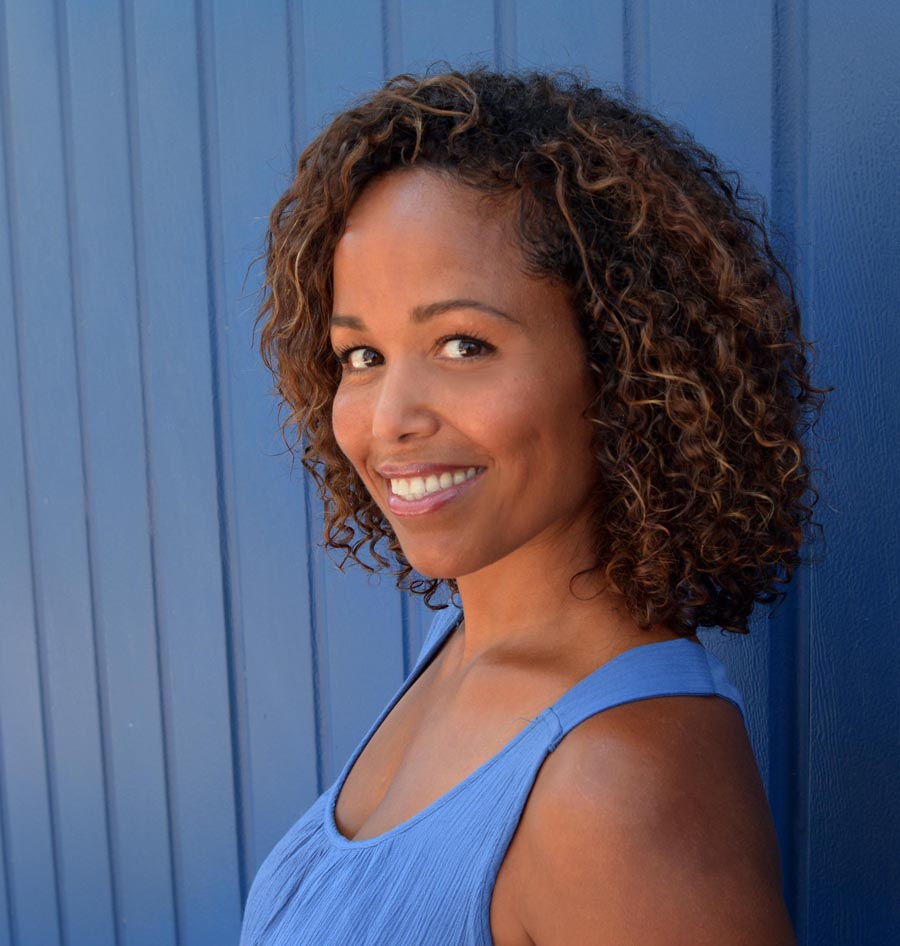
- Johnson in 2016

Personal information
- National team: United States Virgin Islands
- Born: May 1, 1973 (age 53) Frederiksted, St. Croix, United States Virgin Islands
- Education: Howard University
- Other interests: Animal rights, acting, activism, public speaking
- Website: www.sebajohnson.com

Sport
- Country: United States Virgin Islands
- Sport: Alpine skiing
- Events: Slalom; Giant slalom; Super-G
- Retired: 1992
- Updated on 14 August 2016

Seba Johnson is an African American Olympic athlete, actress, and vegan animal rights activist. She was the first black woman to ski at the Olympics, and the youngest alpine ski racer in Olympic history (she competed at age 14).

== Early life ==
Johnson was born in Saint Croix in the U.S. Virgin Islands. Her father was a Tutsi tribesman from Burundi, Africa, and her mother, Suzy, a New Hampshire native, raised Johnson and her half-sister exclusively. Suzy raised Johnson as a vegan from birth, and took her to animal rights protests from a young age.

Johnson spent her childhood traveling with her family to numerous countries, living for a time in New Hampshire and Maine, and later moving to Stateline, Nevada, on the shore of Lake Tahoe. Johnson began skiing at the age of seven. After moving to Nevada, she trained at Heavenly Valley Ski Resort while her mother worked at a casino to support the family.

== Athletic career and activism ==
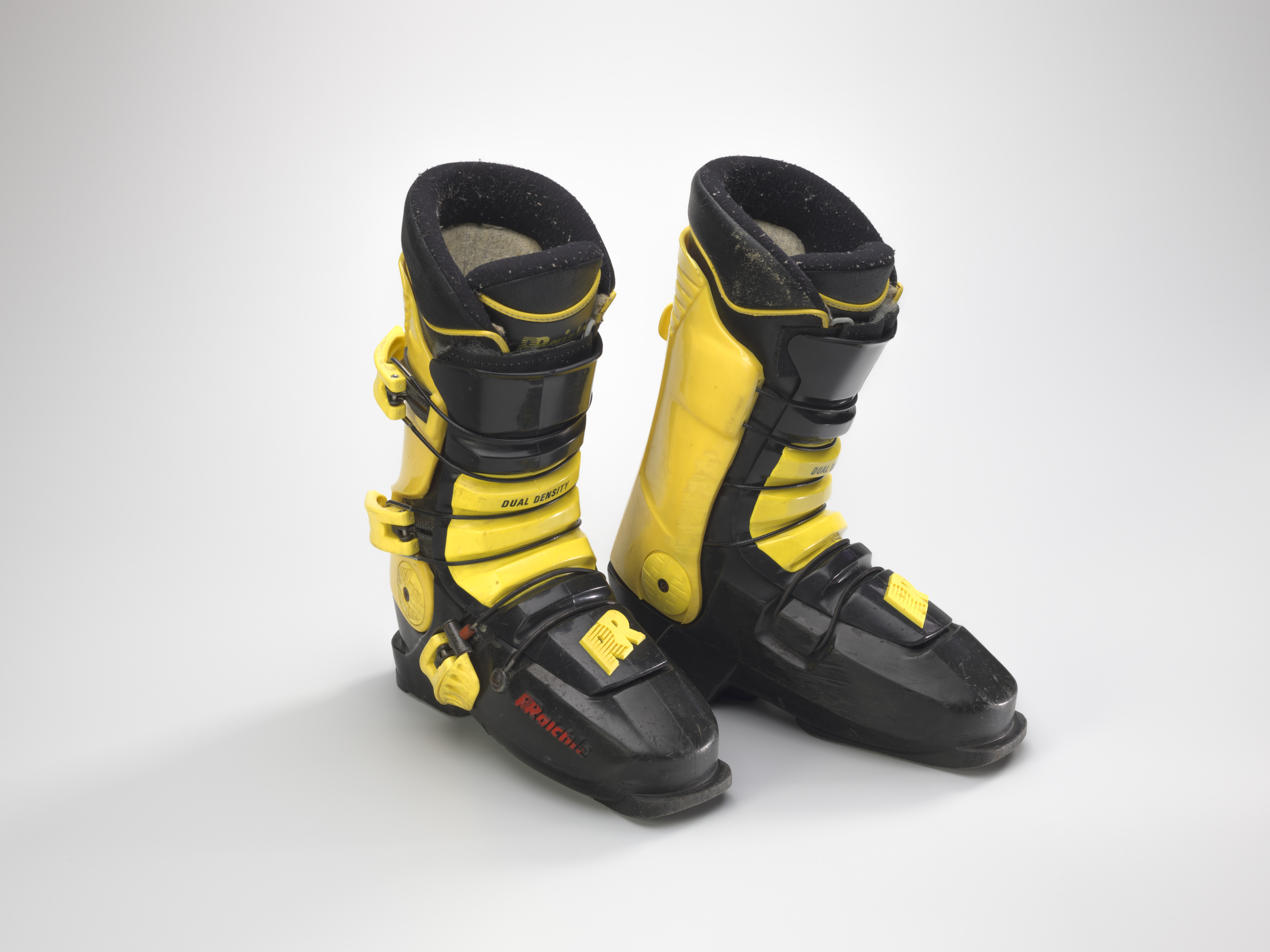
Two ski boots worn by Seba Johnson at the 1988 and/or 1992 Winter Olympics (Smithsonian National Museum of African American History and Culture)

At age 14, Johnson represented the Virgin Islands in giant slalom and Super-G at the 1988 Winter Olympics, where she became the youngest alpine ski racer and first black female skier in Olympic history. She was also the flag bearer in the opening ceremony. At age 15, Johnson became the first black ski racer to finish in the top 30 in international competition. She competed again for the Virgin Islands in slalom and giant slalom at the 1992 Winter Olympics. As of 2014, she remains the only black woman to ski competitively at the Olympic Games.

In 1989, Johnson was disqualified from a World Cup ski race for refusing to wear a suit containing wool and leather. Johnson qualified for the 1994 Winter Olympics, but chose not to compete in protest of Norway's decision to resume whaling. She petitioned the IOC to challenge Japan to end whale and dolphin hunting before the 2020 Summer Olympics in Tokyo. Johnson has also spoken out against homophobia, criticizing the 2014 Winter Olympics in Sochi, Russia for the "horrid anti-gay law that now exists in that host country".

== Education and later pursuits ==
Johnson retired from athletic competition in 1992 to pursue an education in fine arts at Howard University, and to educate youth about health and animal welfare. The racism she experienced as a black skier played a part in her decision to retire early. She is a member of the Screen Actors Guild, and has appeared in commercials and television productions. Johnson lives in Los Angeles and has worked as a special education assistant, has become a Certified Yoga Teacher, and continues to accept requests as an international public speaker.

Johnson's skis are on display in the first exhibit at the Smithsonian National Museum of African American History and Culture.
