= Todor Todorov (bobsleigh) =

Bulgarian bobsledder

Personal information
- Nationality: Bulgarian
- Born: 11 November 1961 (age 63)

Sport
- Sport: Bobsleigh

Todor Todorov (Bulgarian: Тодор Тодоров, born 11 November 1961) is a Bulgarian bobsledder. He competed in the two man event at the 1988 Winter Olympics.
