= Portugal at the 2014 Winter Olympics =

- IOC code: POR
- NOC: Olympic Committee of Portugal
- Website: www.comiteolimpicoportugal.pt (in Portuguese)

in Sochi
- Competitors: 2 in 1 sport
- Flag bearers: Arthur Hanse (opening); Camille Dias (closing)
- Medals: Gold 0 Silver 0 Bronze 0 Total 0

Winter Olympics appearances (overview)
- 1952; 1956–1984; 1988; 1992; 1994; 1998; 2002; 2006; 2010; 2014; 2018; 2022; 2026

Portugal competed at the 2014 Winter Olympics in Sochi, Russia, from 7 to 23 February 2014. It was the country's seventh overall and third consecutive participation at the Olympic Winter Games. The team consisted of two alpine skiers, Arthur Hanse and Camille Dias, which competed in the slalom events.

== Competitors ==
Sport	Men	Women	Total
Alpine skiing	1	1	2
Total	1	1	2

== Alpine skiing ==
According to the quota allocation released on January 20, 2014, Portugal had two athletes in qualification position. This will be the first time Portugal competes in alpine skiing since the 1994 Winter Olympics.

Athlete	Event	Run 1		Run 2		Total	
Athlete	Event	Time	Rank	Time	Rank	Time	Rank
Arthur Hanse	Men's slalom	DNF					
Arthur Hanse	Men's giant slalom	1:30.52	57	DNF			
Camille Dias	Women's slalom	1:05.24	48	1:03.26	41	2:08.50	40
Camille Dias	Women's giant slalom	1:32.70	63	1:34.93	63	3:07.63	59
