= Catarina Rodrigues =

Portuguese judoka

Medal record

Women's judo

Representing Portugal

World Championships
Bronze medal – third place	2001 Munich	Open class

Catarina Rodrigues (born 3 January 1973) is a Portuguese judoka.

She was awarded the Olympic Medal Nobre Guedes in 2001.

== Achievements ==
Year	Tournament	Place	Weight class
2002	European Championships	7th	Half heavyweight (78 kg)
2002	European Championships	5th	Open class
2001	World Championships	3rd	Open class
2001	European Championships	7th	Half heavyweight (78 kg)
2000	European Championships	7th	Middleweight (70 kg)
1999	European Championships	7th	Middleweight (70 kg)
1996	European Championships	7th	Middleweight (70 kg)
1995	European Championships	5th	Middleweight (66 kg)
1994	European Championships	5th	Middleweight (66 kg)
1993	European Championships	5th	Middleweight (66 kg)
