= Aivars Trops =

Latvian bobsledder

Personal information
- Nationality: Latvian
- Born: 22 January 1963 (age 62); Riga, Latvian SSR, Soviet Union

Sport
- Sport: Bobsleigh

Aivars Trops (born 22 January 1963) is a Latvian bobsledder. He competed in the two man event at the 1988 Winter Olympics, representing the Soviet Union.
