= Portuguese Football Federation =

Governing body of football in Portugal

Coordinates: 38°43′16″N 9°09′11″W

Portuguese Football Federation GOIH • ComB
UEFA
- Founded: 31 March 1914; 112 years ago (as Portuguese Football Union)
- Headquarters: Cidade do Futebol, Cruz Quebrada-Dafundo, Oeiras, Portugal
- FIFA affiliation: 1923
- UEFA affiliation: 15 June 1954; 72 years ago
- President: Pedro Proença
- Website: www.fpf.pt

The Portuguese Football Federation (Portuguese: Federação Portuguesa de Futebol [fɨðɨɾɐˈsɐ̃w puɾtuˈɣezɐ ðɨ futɨˈβɔl], FPF) is the governing body of football in Portugal. The federation was formed in 1914 as Portuguese Football Union (Portuguese: União Portuguesa de Futebol, UPF) by the three existing regional associations of Lisbon, Portalegre and Porto, before adopting its current name in 1926, and has its headquarters in City of Football in the city of Oeiras. The (FPF) joined FIFA in 1923 and is also a founding member of UEFA.

The Portuguese Federation oversees all aspects of the game of football in Portugal, both professional, amateur and administers the competition committee (including the handling of the trophy) of the Campeonato de Portugal, the Taça de Portugal and the Supertaça Cândido de Oliveira. It is also responsible for appointing the management of the Portugal national football team (men's), women's, and youth national football teams. The men and women's Portugal national futsal team and Portugal national beach soccer team are also organized by the federation.

== History ==
=== Early days and formation ===
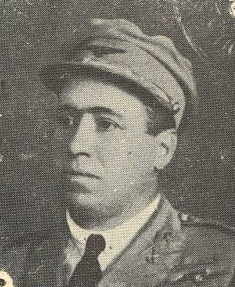
João Luís de Moura, the fourth President of the Portuguese Football Federation

Founded on 31 March 1914 by the three then existing regional associations - Lisbon, Portalegre and Porto - the Portuguese Football Union was the predecessor of the Portuguese Football Federation, which won its name at the Extraordinary Congress of 28 May 1926. The first statues had been previously published on 12 January 1914, after a public notice that had been published to inform the formation of the new body.

In the early years of its existence, the UPF merely organized a number of meetings between the Lisbon and Porto teams, as well as presenting Portugal's bid for FIFA, which was accepted at the XII FIFA Congress, organized in Geneva, in May 1923, in which Portugal became a full member. Until that date, the UPF had been governed by the 1914 statutes, drafted by the first leaders of the new body, including Luís Nunes, who had had a leading role in the creation of the Lisbon Football Association in 1910. These statutes were the main lines of Portuguese football until 1938.

Portugal's first championship the Campeonato de Portugal (a knock-out tournament, precursor of the Taça de Portugal) was only realized in 1921, after several postponements due to the First World War, which delayed the start of several competitions, in the process limited the matches between Lisbon and Porto teams and regional championships in those cities.

This denomination was assumed by deliberation at the Congress of 28 May 1926, but for the amendment to be legal it was necessary to reform the statutes, which would only come into effect from 3 December 1938 and in the process the federation was renamed to Portuguese Football Federation, with João Luís de Moura being elected the first president of the federation. In 1954, Portugal became one of the founding member of UEFA in Basel, Switzerland. On 9 April 1956, the federation received the Commander of the Order of Goodwill. During this time, the FPF changed their headquarters seven times, and in 1968 the federation finally settled their headquarters at Praça da Alegria, nº 25.

=== Silva Resende's term, Saltillo Affair and Gilberto Madaíl term ===
In 1986, Silva Resende was elected president of the federation. During his term in June 1986, the FPF was involved is a series of controversies surrounding the Portugal national football team during its participation in the 1986 FIFA World Cup in Mexico. The team had not competed in a final phase of the World Cup since the 1966 FIFA World Cup twenty years before, where it had achieved an unprecedented 3rd place. Following a rough qualification, the 1986 campaign did not start well with the suspicion of doping falling on one of the players who had been selected for the tournament. Although that test was later proven wrong, that was the first of many controversies to affect the team in the following weeks, that included threats of strikes from the players, the announcement of a series of demands to the Portuguese Federation and reports of inappropriate behavior at the team's headquarters. The international press tagged the incident as "ridiculous", but still took sides with the players due to the situations described by the players, which included being forced to advertise certain products (Adidas and a local brand of beer) without being paid. Despite the incident during the World Cup, Resende retained is position until 1989, when João Rodrigues was elected the new president.

In 1996, Gilberto Madaíl was elected as the 30th president of the Portuguese federation, notwithstanding the voices that demanded the imperative need for a reformulation of the federation, which included in its leaders various personalities who had held the office since the time of the Saltillo Affair. On 12 October 1999, in Aachen, Germany, Portugal was announced as hosts for UEFA Euro 2004, beating Spain and the joint bid of Austria and Hungary. On 5 July 2004, the FPF was made an Honorary Member of the Order of Infante D. Henrique. In 12 October 2004, FPF changed their headquarters for the eight time to a building in Alexandre Herculano avenue, which currently resides today.

=== Recent days and Fernando Gomes term ===
In 2010, after Portugal was eliminated in the 2010 FIFA World Cup and Carlos Queiroz was sacked by the Portuguese Football Federation on 9 September, Madaíl decided to hold elections for the FPF, in which Fernando Gomes was elected as the new and 31st president of the federation on 10 December 2011. On 13 December 2018, FPF appealed to proceed with the integration of the Primeira Liga as soon as possible. On 3 December 2018 in Dublin, Ireland, Portugal was announced the host country of the 2019 UEFA Nations League Finals by the UEFA Executive Committee. On 8 October 2020, Fernando Gomes and his Spanish counterpart Luis Rubiales confirmed that the two countries would be putting forward a joint bid to host the 2030 FIFA World Cup. On 4 October 2023, the FIFA Executive Committee has unanimously accepted the Portugal-Spain-Morocco (who later joined the Iberian bid) as the sole candidate to host the 2030 FIFA World Cup.

== Institution ==
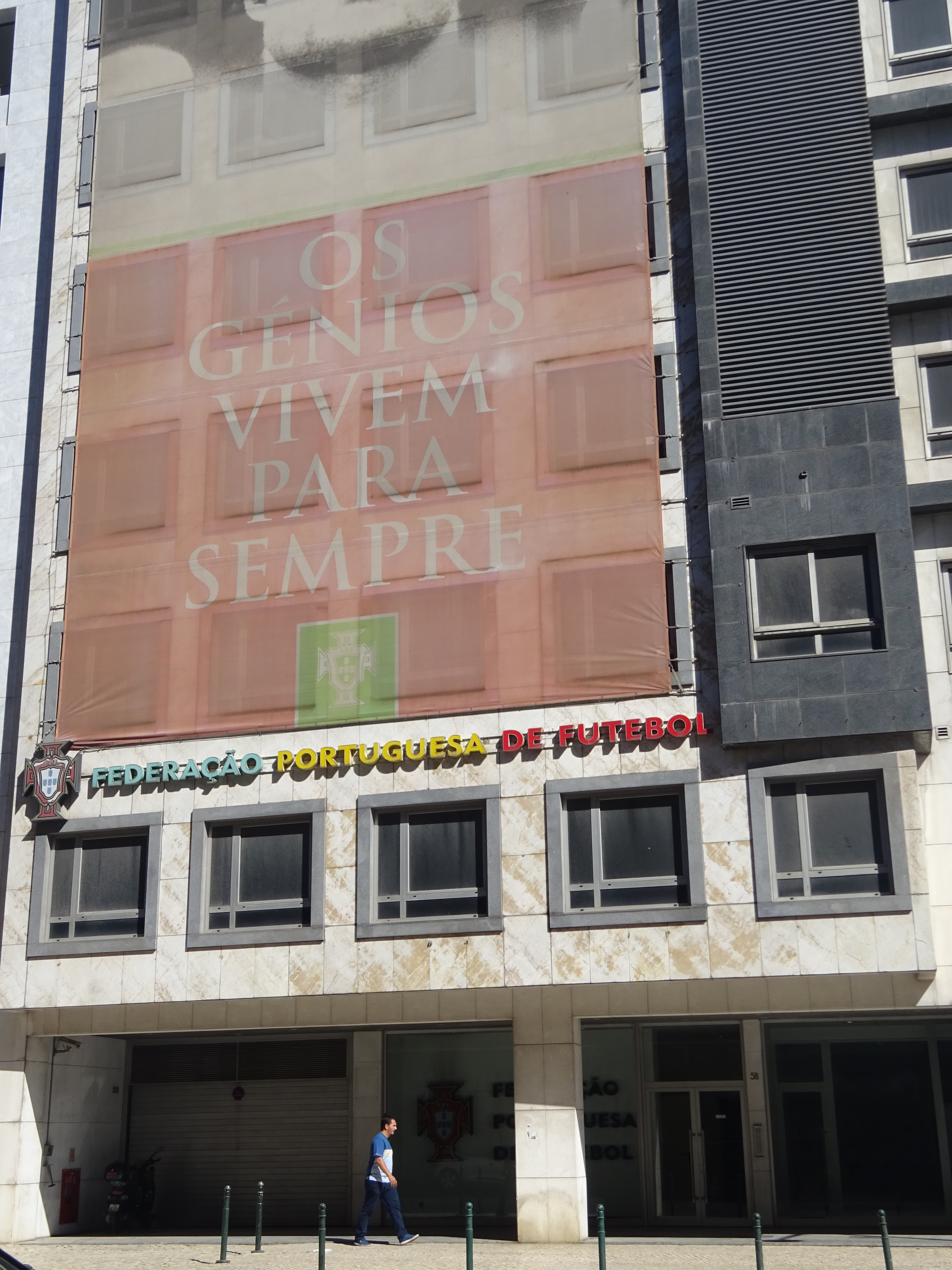
Former FPF headquarters in Lisbon

=== Governing bodies ===
It is up to the Governing Bodies to pursue the object of the FPF, within the scope of their competences, as well as to promote sports ethics, particularly in the fields of combating violence, doping and corruption associated with the sports phenomenon.

==== General Assembly ====
The General Assembly of the Portuguese Football Federation deliberates on all matters submitted for its consideration that are not the exclusive competence of other FPF Governing Bodies. The Federative General Assembly is composed of the Ordinary Members of the body that oversees the National Football, and may still participate in it, but without the right to vote, the holders of FPF Corporate Bodies and the Honorary and Merit Members.

==== Board ====
The Board of the Portuguese Football Federation consists of the president of the FPF, three vice-presidents - for the administrative, financial and sports areas, as well as another designated by the Portuguese Professional Football League - and five Directors.

==== Council of Justice ====
The Justice Council of the Portuguese Football Federation is made up of a president, a vice-president and five members, all law graduates. It shall meet whenever convened by its president and its decisions are based on fact and law.

==== Disciplinary Board ====
The Disciplinary Board of the Portuguese Football Federation is made up of a president, a vice-president and five members, all law graduates. The Disciplinary Board is governed by the statutory rules of operation of the Justice Council, with the necessary adaptations.

It is for the Disciplinary Board to assess and punish, in accordance with applicable regulations, all offenses imputed to persons subject to the disciplinary power of the FPF, without prejudice to the specific competence of the League. This body may order additional evidence to be taken.

==== Arbitration Council ====
The Arbitration Council of the Portuguese Football Federation is endowed with technical autonomy and consists of a president, a vice-president and five members. The council is made up of people with specific qualifications in the arbitration sector - it manages arbitration in the context of competitions organized by the FPF.

==== Fiscal Council ====
The Supervisory Board of the Portuguese Football Federation is made up of a president, a Vice-president and three members, and their holders must have appropriate academic or professional qualifications. This body meets quarterly and, whenever necessary, convened by the Chairman.

== Structure ==
=== Members ===
The FPF is made up of 22 territorial federations, which govern football in the respective districts of Portugal. Although the three districts of the Azores and Madeira (Funchal) were abolished in 1976, the respective federations still exist.

=== Presidents ===
1. Luís Peixoto Guimarães (1922–1925)
2. Franklin Nunes (1925–1927)
3. João Luís de Moura (1927–1928)
4. Luís Plácido de Sousa (1929)
5. Salazar Carreira (1930–1931)
6. Abílio Lagoas (1931–1932)
7. Raúl Vieira (1934)
8. Cruz Filipe (1934–1942)
9. Pires de Lima (1943–1944)
10. Bento Coelho da Rocha (1944–1946)
11. André Navarro (1946–1951)
12. Maia Loureiro (1951–1954)
13. Ângelo Ferrari (1954–1957)
14. Maia Loureiro (1957–1960)
15. Francisco Mega and Paulo Sarmento (1960–1963)
16. Justino Pinheiro Machado (1963–1967)
17. Cazal Ribeiro (1967–1969)
18. Matos Correia (1970–1971)
19. Martins Canaverde (1972–1974)
20. Jorge Fagundes (1974–1976)
21. António Ribeiro Magalhães (1976)
22. António Marques (1976–1979)
23. Morais Leitão (1979–1980)
24. António Ribeiro Magalhães (1980–1981)
25. Romão Martins (1981–1983)
26. Silva Resende (1983–1989)
27. João Rodrigues (1989–1992)
28. A. Lopes da Silva (1992–1993)
29. Vitor Vasques (1993–1996)
30. Gilberto Madaíl (1996–2011)
31. Fernando Gomes (2011–2025)
32. Pedro Proença (2025–present)

== City of Football ==
On 31 March 2016, the Portuguese Football Federation inaugurated the City of Football, a sports complex that acts as the national teams' training center. The sports complex featured the President of Portugal Marcelo Rebelo de Sousa in the inauguration and was built without financial support from the state. The City of Football took 17 months to build and comprised a budget of 15 million euros.

The new home of the Portuguese Football Federation is located at Avenida das Seleções in Oeiras, 1495-433 Cruz Quebrada - Dafundo, and debuted with an under-15 tournament the day after opening. The space has three and a half courts, 2 gyms, 11 changing rooms.

== Kit supplier ==
In November 2024, the Portuguese Football Federation signed a kit agreement with PUMA that will supply kits and equipment for all male, female and youth football squads as well as futsal, beach football and E-Sports teams. This deal eventually ends the partnership with Nike, who had been the official kit supplier for the federation for 27 years since 1997. The multi-year agreement with PUMA will commence in 2025.
