= Per-Anders Persson =

Swedish bobsledder

Personal information
- Nationality: Swedish
- Born: 7 March 1953 (age 72); Karlshamn, Sweden

Sport
- Sport: Bobsleigh

Per-Anders Persson (born 7 March 1953) is a Swedish bobsledder. He competed in the two man event at the 1988 Winter Olympics.
