= Mario Hoyer =

East German bobsledder

Olympic medal record

Men's bobsleigh

Representing East Germany
Bronze medal – third place	1988 Calgary	Two-man

Mario Hoyer (born 26 July 1965) is an East German bobsledder who competed in the late 1980s. He won the bronze medal in the two-man event at the 1988 Winter Olympics in Calgary.
