= Portugal at the 2006 Winter Olympics =

- IOC code: POR
- NOC: Olympic Committee of Portugal
- Website: www.comiteolimpicoportugal.pt (in Portuguese)

in Turin
- Competitors: 1 (1 man) in 1 sport
- Flag bearers: Danny Silva (opening and closing)
- Medals: Gold 0 Silver 0 Bronze 0 Total 0

Winter Olympics appearances (overview)
- 1952; 1956–1984; 1988; 1992; 1994; 1998; 2002; 2006; 2010; 2014; 2018; 2022; 2026

Portugal sent a delegation to compete at the 2006 Winter Olympics in Turin, Italy from 10 to 26 February 2006. This marked the country's fifth appearance in a Winter Olympic Games, their first in eight years as they missed the 2002 Winter Olympics. The Portuguese delegation consisted of a single competitor, Danny Silva, who participated in cross-country skiing. In his only event, the 15 kilometre classical race, he finished in 93rd place.

== Background ==
Portugal debuted in Olympic competition at the 1912 Stockholm Olympics, and have appeared in every Summer Olympics since. The nation made its first appearance in a Winter Olympic Games in 1952. Since then, their attendance has been sporadic, with the country making its second appearance in the 1988 Winter Games. They participated in 1994 and 1998, but missed the 1992 and 2002 editions. Thus, the Turin Olympics were the nation's fifth appearance at a Winter Olympics. The Portuguese delegation to Turin consisted of a single cross-country skier, Danny Silva. He would go on to be the only athlete to represent Portugal again at the 2010 Winter Olympics. Silva was selected as the flag bearer for both the opening ceremony and the closing ceremony.

== Cross-country skiing ==
Danny Silva was 32 years old at the time of the Turin Olympics. His only event was the 15 kilometre classical race, in which he posted a time of 54 minutes and 34 seconds. This placed him 93rd out of 96 competitors who finished the race, and over 16 minutes behind the gold medal time.

Athlete	Event	Final	
Athlete	Event	Total	Rank
Danny Silva	Men's 15 km classical	54:34.1	93
