= Kevin Tyler =

Canadian bobsledder

Personal information
- Nationality: Canadian
- Born: 26 September 1963 (age 61); New Westminster, British Columbia, Canada

Sport
- Sport: Bobsleigh

Kevin Tyler (born 26 September 1963) is a Canadian former bobsledder. He competed in the two man and the four man events at the 1988 Winter Olympics.
