= Camille Dias =

Swiss-Portuguese alpine skier (born 1996)

Personal information
- Born: 28 August 1996 (age 29) Leysin, Switzerland
Medal record
Alpine skiing
Representing Portugal

Camille Dias (born 28 August 1996 in Leysin, Switzerland) is a Swiss-Portuguese alpine skier. She competed for Portugal at the 2014 Winter Olympics in the slalom and giant slalom. Dias is the daughter of emigrants from Portugal who now live in Switzerland, which allows her to compete for the country.

== See also ==
- Portugal at the 2014 Winter Olympics
