= Mike Aljoe =

American bobsledder

Personal information
- Nationality: American
- Born: March 7, 1964 (age 62) Buffalo, New York, United States

Sport
- Sport: Bobsleigh

Michael Charles Aljoe (born March 7, 1964) is an American bobsledder. He competed in the two man event at the 1988 Winter Olympics.

He attended Lewisville High School and later the University of Oklahoma.
