= Angus Stuart (bobsledder) =

Australian bobsledder

Personal information
- Nationality: Australian
- Born: 8 August 1965 (age 59)

Sport
- Sport: Bobsleigh

Angus Stuart (born 8 August 1965) is an Australian bobsledder. He competed in the two man event at the 1988 Winter Olympics.
