= Ullie Akerstrom =

American dramatist (1858–1941)

- Akerstrom in 1894
- Born: Ulrica Regina Akerstrom; March 17, 1858; New York City
- Died: August 10, 1941 (aged 83); Willsboro, New York
- Resting place: Woodlawn Cemetery Bronx, New York, United States
- Other names: Ullie Akerstrom Benedict (after marriage), Ullie Akerstrom Melius (after marriage)
- Occupations: actress, dancer, playwright
- Years active: 1884–
- Known for: Annette, the Dancing Girl
- Notable work: "Toot Yer Horn", and Other Poems (1888)
- Spouse: Abner Benedict (m. 1898; died 1915) George Howard Melius (m. 1919)

Ulrica Regina Akerstrom (March 17, 1858 – August 10, 1941) was an American actress, dancer, playwright and vaudeville performer.

== Early life and career ==
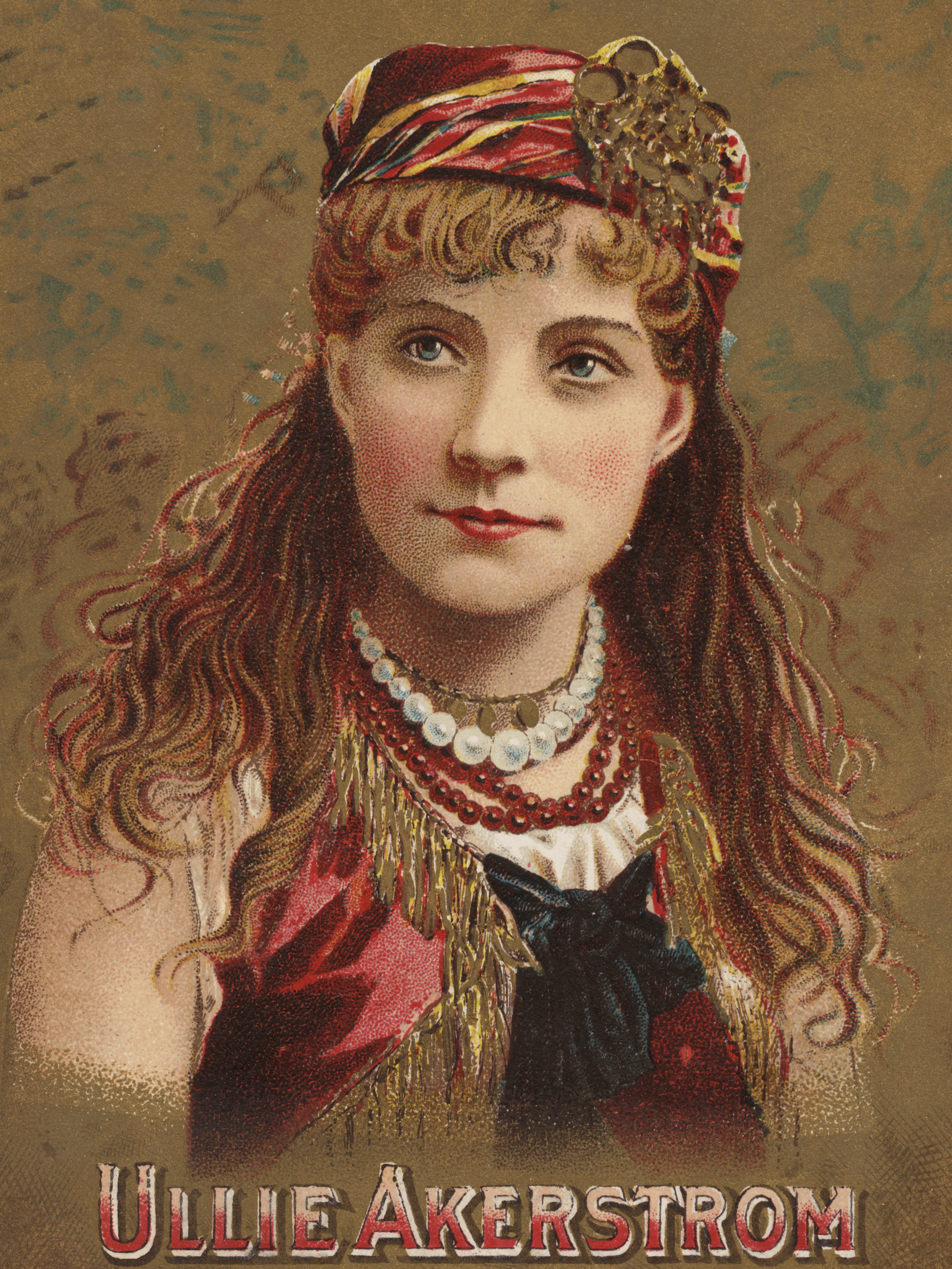

Born in New York City and raised in Chicago, Illinois, Akerstrom was the daughter of Elizabeth W. Watkins and Swedish immigrant Charles G. Akerstrom. When she was 2, the family moved to Chicago, shortly after which her father died. Chicago would remain Akerstrom's primary residence as late as 1896.

While still in her teens, prompted by a bank failure that had wiped out almost all of the family's savings, Akerstrom made her debut as an elocutionist on October 5, 1876, at Chicago's Park Avenue Methodist Episcopal Church, located at the corner of Park Avenue and Robey Street.

She made her first stage appearance in Milwaukee, Wisconsin as a vaudeville performer. She acted in shows including Fanchon the Cricket, The Pearl of Savoy, The Hidden Hand, Annette, the Dancing Girl (1889, her New York debut), Renah, the Gipsey's Daughter, A Little Busybody (1891), A Strange Marriage, Under the City Lights (1898), A Beautiful Slave, a Waif of London (1898), and A Bachelor's Housekeeper (1898).

Akerstrom wrote several plays and sketches during her performing years, including Viola, the Street Singer (1886), Renah, the Gipsey's Daughter (1886), Annette the Dancing Girl (1889), Miss Rosa, A Pauper's Fortune (1893), Queen of the Arena (1893), A Woman's Vengeance (1895), The Story of a Crime (1895), That Smith Gal, Little Busybody, The Egyptian Dancer, and The Doctor's Warm Reception (1901). Akerstrom also published a book of popular verse, "Toot Yer Horn", and Other Poems (1888).

A revival of Akerstrom's Miss Rosa, staged in the United Kingdom circa 1895, featured famed Wild West performer Annie Oakley in the title role, making her professional acting debut.

Akerstrom retired from the stage in 1903 and lived in Brooklyn, writing sketches, plays, and lyrics. She also produced shows. Works by Akerstrom from this period included A Doctor by Courtesy; or, A Jolly Mixup (1906), The Widow (1910), St. Elmo (1910), The Plot (1910), An Election Episode (1910), Adventures; or, The Woman Hater (1910), Vashti; or, Until Death Do Us Part (1910), The Reckoning (1911), Mental Suggestion; or, Made in Germany (1911), Mrs. Murphy's Second Husband (1911), Natasha (1911), The Eleventh Hour; or, Two Sisters (1911), A Story of the Hills (1911), The Wager (1912), The Sultan's Daughter (1912), The Sultan's Favorite (1912), Sunshine (1912), Our New Girl (1912), The Red Mask (1913), Caught with the Goods (1915), Over the Hills to the Poor House (1921), The Haunted Fliver; or, What's the Answer (1935) and Call of the King (1938).

She moved to Florida by 1935, but remained active in local theatrical productions, as a performer, writer and producer.

== Personal life ==
Akerstrom married her manager, Abner Benedict (known professionally as Gus Bernard), in 1898; he died in 1915. She married again, to George Howard Melius, in 1919.
