= Rogério Tavares =

Portuguese sports shooter

Personal information
- Born: 3 December 1912 Porto, Portugal

Sport
- Sport: Sports shooting

Rogério Tavares (born 3 December 1912, date of death unknown) was a Portuguese sports shooter. He competed at the 1952 Summer Olympics and 1960 Summer Olympics.
