= José Vicente de Moura =

José Vicente de Moura (born 1937) is the current president of the Olympic Committee of Portugal since 1997. This is his second term on this office, as he also held this position from 1990 to 1992. He was Portugal's chief of mission at the 1984 Summer Olympics in Los Angeles, where this nation conquered its first Olympic gold medal.

Besides his work with the Olympic Committee of Portugal, Vicente Moura was also a prominent member of Sporting Portugal, a leading and influential multi-sport club in the country.
