= Christopher Sharpless =

United States Virgin Islands bobsledder (1945–2025)

Personal information
- Full name: Christopher Roland Sharpless
- Born: August 23, 1945 Bryan, Texas, U.S.
- Died: October 1, 2025 (aged 80) St. Marys, Georgia, U.S.

Sport
- Sport: Bobsleigh

Christopher Roland Sharpless (August 23, 1945 – October 1, 2025) was a bobsledder who represented the United States Virgin Islands. He competed in the two man event at the 1988 Winter Olympics.

Sharpless died from complications of Parkinson's disease on October 1, 2025, in St. Marys, Georgia, at the age of 80.
