= Jorge Tamés =

Mexican bobsledder (born 1958)

Personal information
- Nationality: Mexican
- Born: 9 May 1958 (age 66)

Sport
- Sport: Bobsleigh

Jorge Tamés (born 9 May 1958) is a Mexican bobsledder. He competed at the 1988 Winter Olympics and the 1992 Winter Olympics.
