= Harvey Hook =

United States Virgin Islands bobsledder

Personal information
- Nationality: American Virgin Islander
- Born: August 8, 1935
- Died: October 14, 2011 (aged 76)

Sport
- Sport: Bobsleigh

Harvey Hook (August 8, 1935 – October 14, 2011) was a bobsledder who represented the United States Virgin Islands. He competed in the two man event at the 1988 Winter Olympics.
