= Jorge Magalhães =

Portuguese bobsledder

Personal information
- Nationality: Portuguese
- Born: 10 April 1964 (age 60)

Sport
- Sport: Bobsleigh

Jorge Magalhães (born 10 April 1964) is a Portuguese bobsledder. He competed in the two-man event at the 1988 Winter Olympics.
