= Rolf Åkerström =

Swedish bobsledder (born 1960)

Personal information
- Nationality: Swedish
- Born: 22 May 1960 (age 64); Stockholm, Sweden

Sport
- Sport: Bobsleigh

Rolf Åkerström (born 22 May 1960) is a Swedish bobsledder. He competed in the two man event at the 1988 Winter Olympics.
