= Kequyen Lam =

Portugal cross-country skier

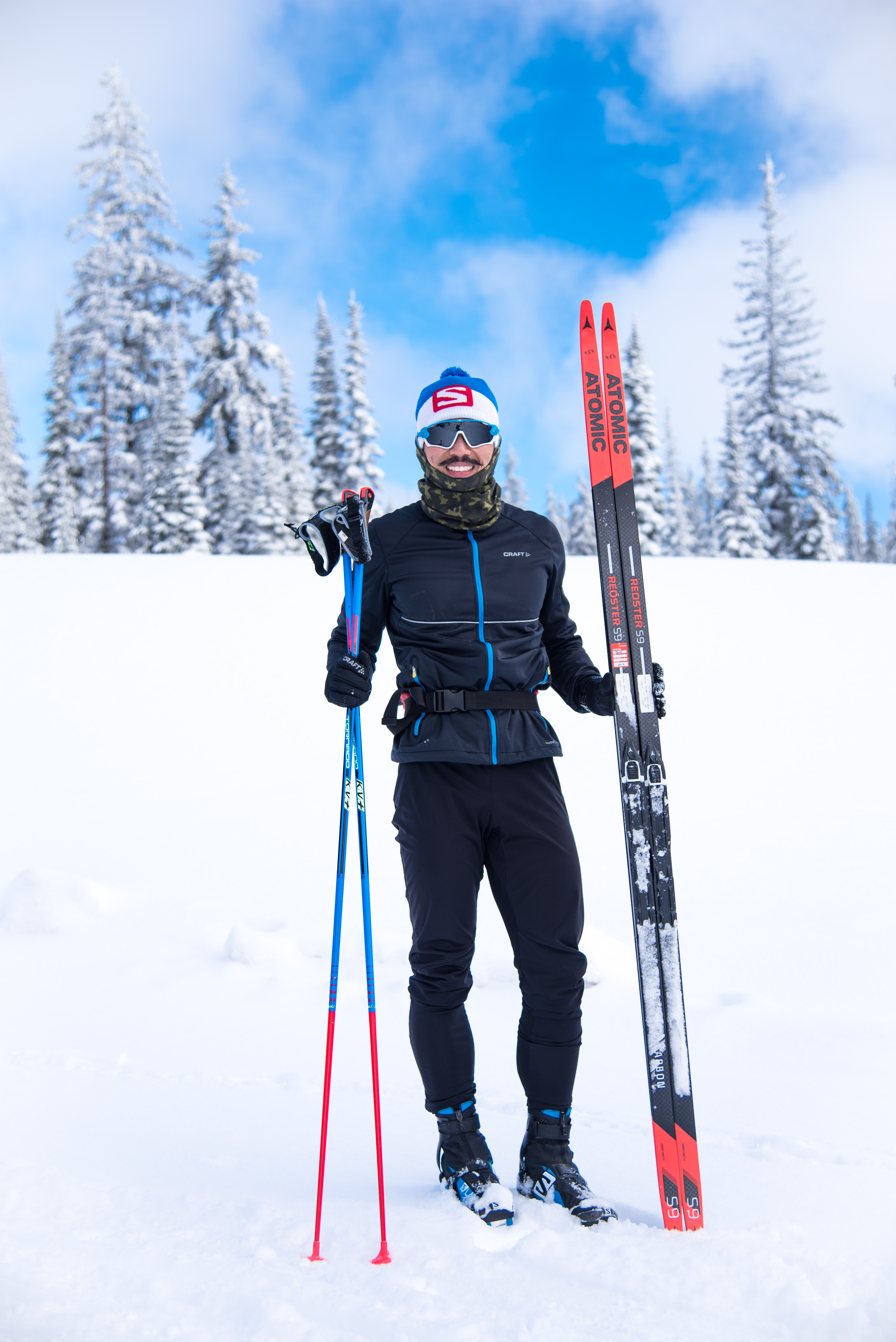

Personal information
- Full name: Kequeyn Lam
- Born: October 3, 1979 (age 47) Portuguese Macau
- Height: 1.72 m (5 ft 8 in)

Sport
- Sport: Skiing

World Cup career
- Seasons: 2015–Present

Kequyen Lam (born 3 October 1979) is a cross-country skier who was the flag bearer for Portugal at the 2018 Winter Olympics Parade of Nations. He was one of the two athletes representing Portugal at the 2018 Winter Olympics.

== Early Life ==
On October 3, 1979, Lam was born in Macau.

== Career ==
=== Snowboard Cross (2008–2013) ===
Kequyen raced snowboard cross from 2008–2013 representing Portugal. His break out season was in 2011 when he finished 1st place in two FIS races at Big White and a 1st and 2nd place at the FIS races in Red Mountain. Lam qualified to race on the World Cup Tour where he raced from 2011–2013. He attempted to qualify for the Winter Olympics in Sochi, Russia, 2014, but an injury at a training camp in Austria sidelined him from the remaining qualifying events, missing the qualification criteria. He retired from snowboard cross in 2013.

=== Cross Country Skiing (2015-present) ===
Kequyen cross country skis in the freestyle skate distance events. He entered his first cross country ski race in 2015 at Canmore, AB. In 2017, he raced in Finland and in South America (Chile, Argentina, Colombia). Lam qualified for the 2018 Winter Olympics. He is the sole cross country skier representing Portugal at the 2018 Winter Olympics in PyeongChang, South Korea where he placed 113th in the men's 15 km freestyle.

== Personal Life ==
Lam is a Portuguese. But he is living in Canada. Lam's parents are Vietnamese people who fled Vietnam, spending a month on an open boat before landing in Macau. Lam was conceived and born in a refugee camp in Macao in 1979, which was then a Portuguese colony, giving him Portuguese citizenship. Lam holds a Bachelors of Science degree in Kinesiology from Simon Fraser University and Bachelors of Science degree in Pharmacy from the University of British Columbia. He is also a tiny house aficionado having built a tiny house in Squamish, BC, where he lived temporarily in 2015. He now lives and trains in Vernon, BC, Canada.
