= João Pires (bobsleigh) =

Portuguese bobsledder

Personal information
- Nationality: Portuguese
- Born: 10 March 1969 (age 56)

Sport
- Sport: Bobsleigh

João Pires (born 10 March 1969) is a Portuguese bobsledder. He competed in the two man and the four man events at the 1988 Winter Olympics.
