= John Reeve (bobsleigh) =

United States Virgin Islands bobsledder

Personal information
- Nationality: American Virgin Islander
- Born: November 7, 1937 (age 87)

Sport
- Sport: Bobsleigh

John Reeve (born November 7, 1937) is a bobsledder who represented the United States Virgin Islands. He competed in the two man event at the 1988 Winter Olympics.
