= Antonio Reis (bobsleigh) =

Portuguese bobsledder

Personal information
- Nationality: Portuguese
- Born: 16 December 1959 (age 66)

Sport
- Sport: Bobsleigh

Antonio Reis (born 16 December 1959) is a Portuguese bobsledder. He competed in the two man and the four man events at the 1988 Winter Olympics and was the flag bearer for Portugal in the opening ceremony.
