= João Poupada =

Portuguese bobsledder (born 1965)

Personal information
- Nationality: Portuguese
- Born: 5 March 1965 (age 60)

Sport
- Sport: Bobsleigh

João Poupada (born 5 March 1965) is a Portuguese bobsledder. He competed in the two man and the four man events at the 1988 Winter Olympics.
