= Fausto Marreiros =

Portuguese speed skater

Personal information
- Nationality: Portuguese
- Born: 4 May 1966 (age 58)

Sport
- Sport: Speed skating

Fausto Marreiros (born 4 May 1966) is a Portuguese speed skater. He competed in the men's 5000 metres event at the 1998 Winter Olympics.
