= Luis Adrián Tamés =

Mexican bobsledder (born 1960)

Personal information
- Nationality: Mexican
- Born: 29 August 1960 (age 64)

Sport
- Sport: Bobsleigh

Luis Adrián Tamés (born 29 August 1960) is a Mexican bobsledder. He competed at the 1988 Winter Olympics and the 1992 Winter Olympics.
