= Danny Silva =

Portuguese cross-country skier (born 1973)

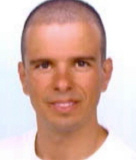

Personal information
- Nationality: Portuguese and American
- Born: July 24, 1973 Perth Amboy, New Jersey, United States
- Height: 165 cm (5 ft 5 in)

Sport
- Sport: Skiing
- Updated on 3 January 2010

Daniel Silva (born 1973) is an American-born Portuguese cross-country skier who has competed since 2004. Competing in two Winter Olympics, he earned his best finish of 93rd in the 15 km classical event at Turin in 2006.

Raised in Perth Amboy, New Jersey, Silva's best finish at the FIS Nordic World Ski Championships was 77th in the individual sprint event at Sapporo in 2007.

He represented Portugal at the 2006 Winter Olympics as the only member of its delegation.

His best career finish was ninth in a lesser event at a 2 x 5 km pursuit event in Poland in 2006.
