= José Cabeça =

Portuguese skier (born 1996)

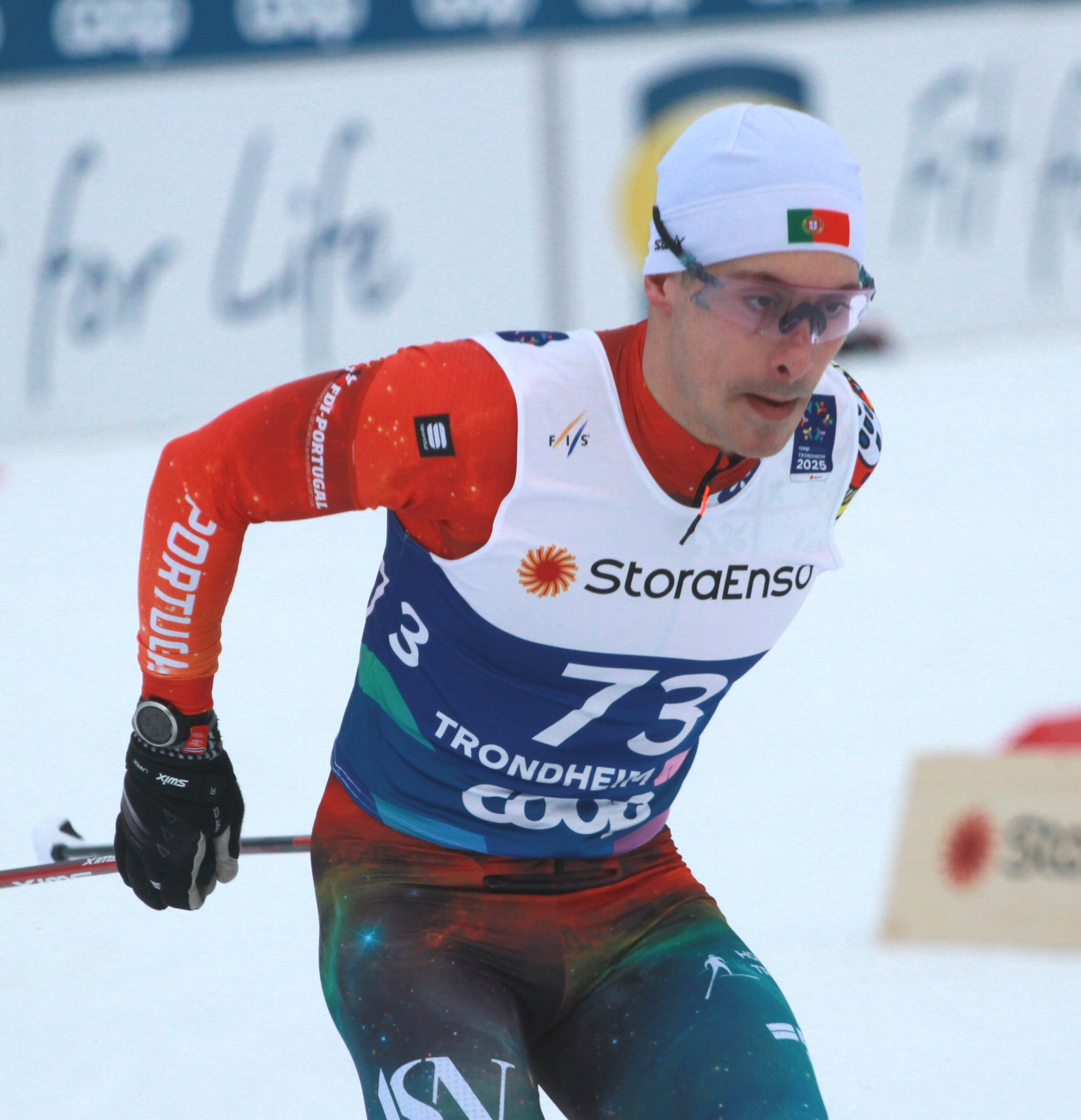

Personal information
- Full name: José Manuel Dias Cabeça
- Born: 5 March 1996 (age 30) Évora, Portugal

Sport
- Country: Portugal
- Sport: Cross-country skiing

José Manuel Dias Cabeça (born 5 March 1996 in Évora) is a Portuguese triathlete and cross-country skier, representing Portugal at the Winter Olympic Games.

The Évora-born athlete learned to ski using YouTube, and after two years, in 2022, he achieved Portugal's best-ever ranking in cross-country skiing.

In 2026, he was part of the Portuguese team for the second time at the 2026 Winter Games, competing in cross-country skiing, sprint, and freestyle, being Portugal's standard-bearer.

== Olympic Games Representation ==
- 2026 Winter Olympic Games
- 2022 Winter Olympic Games
