= Georges Mendes =

Portuguese alpine skier (born 1974)

Personal information
- Nationality: Portuguese
- Born: 26 May 1974 (age 50); Riba de Mouro, Portugal

Sport
- Sport: Alpine skiing

Georges Mendes (born 26 May 1974) is a Portuguese alpine skier. He competed in four events at the 1994 Winter Olympics. He was also the flag bearer for Portugal at the games.
