= Duarte Silva =

Portuguese alpine skier (1924–2015)

Personal information
- Full name: Duarte José Borges Coutinho do Espírito Santo Silva
- Nationality: Portuguese
- Born: 20 March 1924; Lisbon, Portugal
- Died: 25 December 2015 (aged 91)

Sport
- Country: Portugal
- Sport: Alpine skiing

Duarte Silva (20 March 1924 – 25 December 2015) was a Portuguese alpine skier. He was born in Lisbon. He competed at the 1952 Winter Olympics in Oslo, where he placed 69th in the downhill. He was the only participant from Portugal at the 1952 Olympics.
