= Arthur Hanse =

Portuguese alpine skier (born 1993)

Personal information
- Born: 10 February 1993 (age 33) Paris, France
- Height: 1.78 m (5 ft 10 in)
- Weight: 86 kg (190 lb)
Medal record
Alpine skiing
Representing Portugal

Arthur Hanse (born 10 February 1993 in Paris, France) is an alpine skier competing for Portugal. He competed for Portugal at the 2014 Winter Olympics in the slalom and giant slalom. Hanse is the son of emigrants from Portugal who now live in France, which allows him to compete for the country. Hanse originally competed for his native France until November 2013.
