= Mafalda Pereira =

Portuguese freestyle skier

Personal information
- Born: 27 October 1976 (age 48)

Sport
- Country: Portugal
- Sport: Freestyle skiing

Mafalda Pereira (born 27 October 1976) is a Portuguese freestyle skier. She competed at the 1998 Winter Olympics in Nagano, in women's aerials.
