= Olympic Committee of Portugal =

- Country: Portugal
- Code: POR
- Created: October 26, 1909
- Recognized: 1909
- Continental Association: EOC
- Headquarters: Lisbon, Portugal
- President: Fernando Soares Gomes da Silva
- Secretary General: Diana Duarte Gomes Pedras
- Website: www.comiteolimpicoportugal.pt

The Olympic Committee of Portugal (Portuguese: Comité Olímpico de Portugal [kumiˈtɛ ɔˈlĩpiku ðɨ puɾtuˈɣal], acronym: COP; IOC Code: POR) is a non-profit organisation of public utility, which serves as the National Olympic Committee (NOC) for Portugal. It was founded on October 26, 1909, to ensure a timely, methodical and state-sponsored participation at the Games of the V Olympiad, in Stockholm. Thus, it was the 13th nation to join the Olympic Movement.

As a NOC, its responsibilities include the setup and management of a delegation for the Olympic Games, and fundraising to support Olympic-related sports development programmes, by cooperation with public and private entities. A universe of 64 national sports federations is assembled under the COP's wing as members with voting power. This intimate relationship with the federations helps carrying their interests close to the government and official organisms, and ensures their active and decisive intervention on the committee's internal affairs.

The current president is José Manuel Constantino, who was elected in 2013. Former president Fernando Lima Bello is the current Portuguese delegate at the International Olympic Committee (IOC).

== History ==
Portugal had an official representative (António de Lencastre) at the IOC, since 9 June 1906, whose proposal came directly from King Carlos I himself, a known sports-lover. Nevertheless, the country lacked a proper organisation that would handle exclusively with the logistics, fundings and preparations required for an Olympic participation. In this way, the COP's establishment on 26 October 1909, filled this "institutional hole". However, not everyone regards this date as the official Olympism's date of institution in Portugal. Sources defend the date when António de Lencastre accepted Pierre de Coubertin's offer (9 June 1906) as the real accession date to the Olympic Movement, which would make this nation the 10th to do it, not the 13th, as is. An edition of the newspaper "Sports Ilustrado", from May 4, 1912, even claims the COP's foundation on April 30 of that year, that is, three years later than what is the currently recognised date. It is uncertain whether 1912 is the true foundation year, but it is believed that this date was not adopted later on by the COP, so that Portugal would not lose its place on the IOC founding members' list

The COP was developed on the structure of the now-extinct Sociedade Promotora de Educação Física Nacional (English: Society for the National Promotion of Physical Education) whose president, Jaime Mauperrin Santos, became the COP's first president. The primary goal for the committee's creation was to organise a mission to participate at the 1912 Summer Olympics in Sweden. Thus, between 1910 and 1912, the COP promoted the "Games for Olympic preparation", which were a renamed version of the "National Olympic Games". Finally, in 1912 this goal was fulfilled and the Games of the V Olympiad were Portugal's first. On August 14, 1919, the Portuguese Minister of Public Instruction signed a decree, officially recognizing the COP and granting it a subsidy.

In 1925, the COP organised the first "National Athletics Games" and the first "International Sports Games", which only allowed amateurs to take part. The aims of these games were the promotion of sports practice and cultural contact with other competitors, and the motivation of Portuguese athletes to prepare themselves for a participation at the 1928 Summer Olympics. The delegations at the 1932 and 1936 Summer Olympics were smaller than in previous Olympiads because of financial problems to which the government was not sensible. Nevertheless, in Berlin, Portugal conquered its third Olympic medal.

In 1939, during the 39th IOC Session, in London, the Portuguese member suggested the promotion of roller hockey to Olympic sport, however the committee delayed any decision. During World War II, the IOC, taking advantage of Portugal's neutrality, used its national committee as its correspondence transmitter for the other European NOCs. After the war, the relationship between the COP and government became tense when the latter tried to interfere with the NOC's autonomy. As response to COP's "disobedience", state funding was canceled and the committee members had to finance themselves the Olympic participation at the London Games. Surprisingly, this participation was the largest ever and the most rewarding at that time, with two medals and the first silver. The country's participation at the 1960 Games of Rome was unassured because of disagreements inside the COP structure. It was only decided on the last minute with a direct intervention of the IOC president Avery Brundage, on a visit to Lisbon.

In the following four years, the COP had two members elected for the newly created International Olympic Academy (1962) and started publishing its bimonthly magazine "Olimpo" (1964), which still exists.

Despite political pressure and government funding cuts, the COP set up a public fundraising campaign and, with the IOC's support, managed to send a symbolic delegation to the boycotted Moscow Games, thus displaying a strong loyalty to the Olympic values. The participation in the following Games was to be, however, Portugal's best as Carlos Lopes paved his way to victory on the marathon, and the national anthem echoed for the first time inside an Olympic stadium. On October 26, 1984, the IOC president Juan Antonio Samaranch visited Portugal to take part in the 75th anniversary's ceremonies of the Portuguese presence in the Olympic Movement. Later that year, the COP celebrated the Movement's 90th anniversary of its foundation in 1894. Three years later, the Portuguese Olympic Academy (Portuguese: Academia Olímpica de Portugal, AOP) is created as an integrated organism of the COP.

After ending its presidencial term, Fernando Lima Bello was elected IOC member for Portugal, in 1989; a position he still exerts currently. He was succeeded on the COP leadership by current president José Vicente de Moura. In 1991, the COP was represented at the first "European Youth Olympic Days" (now called European Youth Olympic Festival, EYOF), held in Brussels. A year later, the committee approved the institution's name changing from Comité Olímpico Português (English: Portuguese Olympic Committee) to the current Comité Olímpico de Portugal.

=== Meetings and events ===
The COP's abilities as an organiser of international meetings and events and were shown on several occasions. Seven years after its recognition by the government, the COP convinced the IOC to hold its 24th Session in Lisbon, from 2 to May 9, 1926. The city was also two-time host to the General Assembly of the Association of European National Olympic Committees (AENOC) — the future European Olympic Committees association (EOC): in 1975, marked by the association's statutes approval, and in 1994. In 1985, the city stages a well-attended meeting of the Association of National Olympic Committees (ANOC), with the presence of the IOC.

In 1997, the 4th EYOF takes place in the Portuguese capital as result of a successful COP bid. A year later, the IOC was represented at the Expo '98, Lisbon's World's Fair, following a three-year early invitation by the COP.

== Presidents ==
Since 1909, eleven men have occupied the COP's presidency:

- Jaime Mauperrin Santos (1909–1912)
- António Prestes Salgueiro (1919–1923)
- José Pontes (1924–1956)
- Francisco Nobre Guedes (1957–1968)
- Alexandre Correia Leal (1969–1972)
- Gaudêncio Costa (1973–1976)
- Daniel Sales Grade (1977–1980)
- Fernando Lima Bello (1981–1989)
- José Vicente de Moura (1990–1992)
- Vasco Lynce (1993–1996)
- José Vicente de Moura (1997–2025)
- Fernando Soares Gomes da Silva (2025–current)

== Organization ==
=== Structure ===
The committee is composed by three social organs, namely:

- Plenary Assembly
- Executive Commission
- Auditory Council

Elections for these organs occur every first trimester of the year following that of the Summer Olympic Games. Every term (except those of the IOC members) has a duration correspondent to an Olympiad, that is, 4 years. The current social organs were elected on March 11, 2005, for the XXIX Olympiad period (January 1, 2008 – December 31, 2012).

There are six other entities bound to the COP, that were created within the committee. These comprise the Portuguese Olympic Academy (AOP), the Olympic Athletes Commission, and four other advisory commissions:

- Juridical Commission
- Medical Commission
- Multi-disciplinary Commission
- Olympic Preparation Supporting Department (Departamento de Apoio à Preparação Olímpica - DAPO)

==== Plenary Assembly ====
This organ contains all the institution's power and it is headed by the COP president. The elements which constitute the Assembly are:

Ordinary Members	Elements
Sports federations	2 per federation^{§}
Olympic Athletes Commission	2^{§}
Portuguese IOC member(s)	1 (or more)
Extraordinary Members	Elements
Education and disability-related sports organisms	1
Multi-sport, cultural and scientific entities which contribute to COP's objectives	1
§ - one element being the president or its representative

==== Executive Commission ====
The members which compose this social organ are:

- President – José Vicente de Moura
- Vice-Presidents:
  - Mário Rui Tavares Saldanha
  - Artur Manuel Moreira Lopes
  - Manuel da Silva Brito
  - Carlos Alberto de Sousa Lopes
  - Vicente Henrique Gonçalves de Araújo
- Secretary General – Manuel José Marques da Silva
- Bursar – João José Areias Barbosa Matos
- Vogals:
  - Mário Miguel Oliveira Marques dos Santos
  - Sandra Sofia Valente Monteiro
  - António Nogueira Lopes Aleixo
  - José Pedro Sarmento Rebocho Lopes
  - Maria Angélica Esteves Salgado Paula Santos
  - Paulo José Frischknecht
  - José Luís Moreira Ferreira
- Olympic Athletes Commission President – Nuno Barreto
- Olympic Academy President – Sílvio Rafael
- IOC Member – Fernando Lima Bello

==== Auditory Council ====
The members which compose this social organ are:

- President – António Magalhães Barros Feu
- Secretary – Pedro José Araújo de Sousa Ribeiro
- Report-maker – Florindo Baptista Morais
- Mandatary – Alberto Rodrigues Coelho

=== Funding ===
As a non-profit organisation, the COP's financial resources have their origin on donations and extended financial support from private and public entities. These resources are constituted by:

- membership fees;
- state (or other national public institutions), IOC and EOC subsidies;
- sponsor and marketing contracts' revenue;
- inheritances and donations;
- private subsidies and financial support, and
- income from the issue of commemorative stamps and coins.

== Objectives ==
According to the statutes approved on the Plenary Assembly of May 7, 1998, the COP's main objectives are:

- Spread, develop and defend the Olympic Movement and sports in general, in compliance with the Olympic Charter;
- Promote taste for sports as a character-building, health-strengthening, environment-defending and social integration-promoting means;
- Fight against forbidden methods and substances use, observing the IOC Medical Code regulations and cooperating with national authorities in the control of those practices;
- Promote the keeping of sporting ethics on competitions and agents relations;
- Take measures regarding the elimination of any sort of discrimination by sexual, race or religious reasons in the practice of sport and in the managing bodies;
- Participate compulsorily at the Olympic Games and organise and manage exclusively the national delegation, being responsible for the actions and behaviours of its members;
- Assign the candidate city to organise the Olympic Games and assure their accomplishment, when they take place on national territory;
- Represent the national sports federations close to the government and official organisms, on the matters of their attributions;
- Promote the spread of Olympism values in sport and physical education teaching programmes at school and university establishments;
- Stimulate and support the training of sports agents;
- Support the activities of the Olympic Academy, Olympic Museum or any other Olympic education and cultural program-devoted institutions related with the Olympic Movement;
- Cooperate with governmental and non-governmental organisms on any sporting activities which do not contradict the Olympic Charter;
- Coordinate the Olympic preparation programs with the federations;
- Participate with public or private entities in funding acquisition and management, to support Olympic preparation and competition-developing programs, directly or through adequate organisms;
- Support the institutionalization of the Court of Arbitration for Sport.

== Sports federations ==
In 1925, members from seven national sports federations were invited to become part of the COP's "Technical Council". This act was the first formal relationship between sports federations and a NOC, which would be considered a compulsory action by the IOC, in 1957.

Currently there are 64 sports federations linked to the COP as ordinary members, of which 30 comprise Olympic sports (such as athletics, basketball, fencing, judo, skiing, swimming or wrestling) and 34 supervise non-Olympic sports (such as autosport, chess, golf, roller skating or surfing).

== Awards and decorations ==
COP has been distinguished throughout its history by both the IOC and the Portuguese government:

- 1968 – Diploma de Mérito Olímpico (Olympic Merit Diploma) – handed to ceasing COP president Francisco Nobre Guedes by the IOC president Avery Brundage; Troféu Molhasses Tear (Molhasses Tear Trophy)– handed to COP member Rodrigo Castro Pereira by the IOC;
- 1984 – Medalha de Mérito Desportivo (Sporting Merit Medal) – handed to the COP banner by Portuguese prime-minister Mário Soares;
- 1989 – Colar de Honra ao Mérito Desportivo (Honour for Sporting Merit Collar) - handed to the Portuguese IOC member Raul Pereira de Castro by Portuguese education minister Roberto Carneiro;
- 1991 – Medalha de Honra ao Mérito Desportivo (Honour for Sporting Merit Medal) – handed by Portuguese education minister Roberto Carneiro to the COP, during its 82nd anniversary;
- 1999 – Colar de Honra ao Mérito Desportivo – handed by the Portuguese government to the COP at the latter's 90th anniversary gala dinner, which was attended by current IOC president Jacques Rogge.

It is also COP's function to distinguish national competitors and sports-related organisations for their contribution to Portuguese sport both internally and internationally. The Olympic Medal Nobre Guedes is COP's most prestigious award for still-active Portuguese sportspeople, having been given every year since 1951.

== See also ==
- Portugal at the Olympics
- ACOLOP
- Lusophony Games
