= Fencing at the 1928 Summer Olympics – Men's épée =

Olympic fencing event

Men's épée at the Games of the IX Olympiad
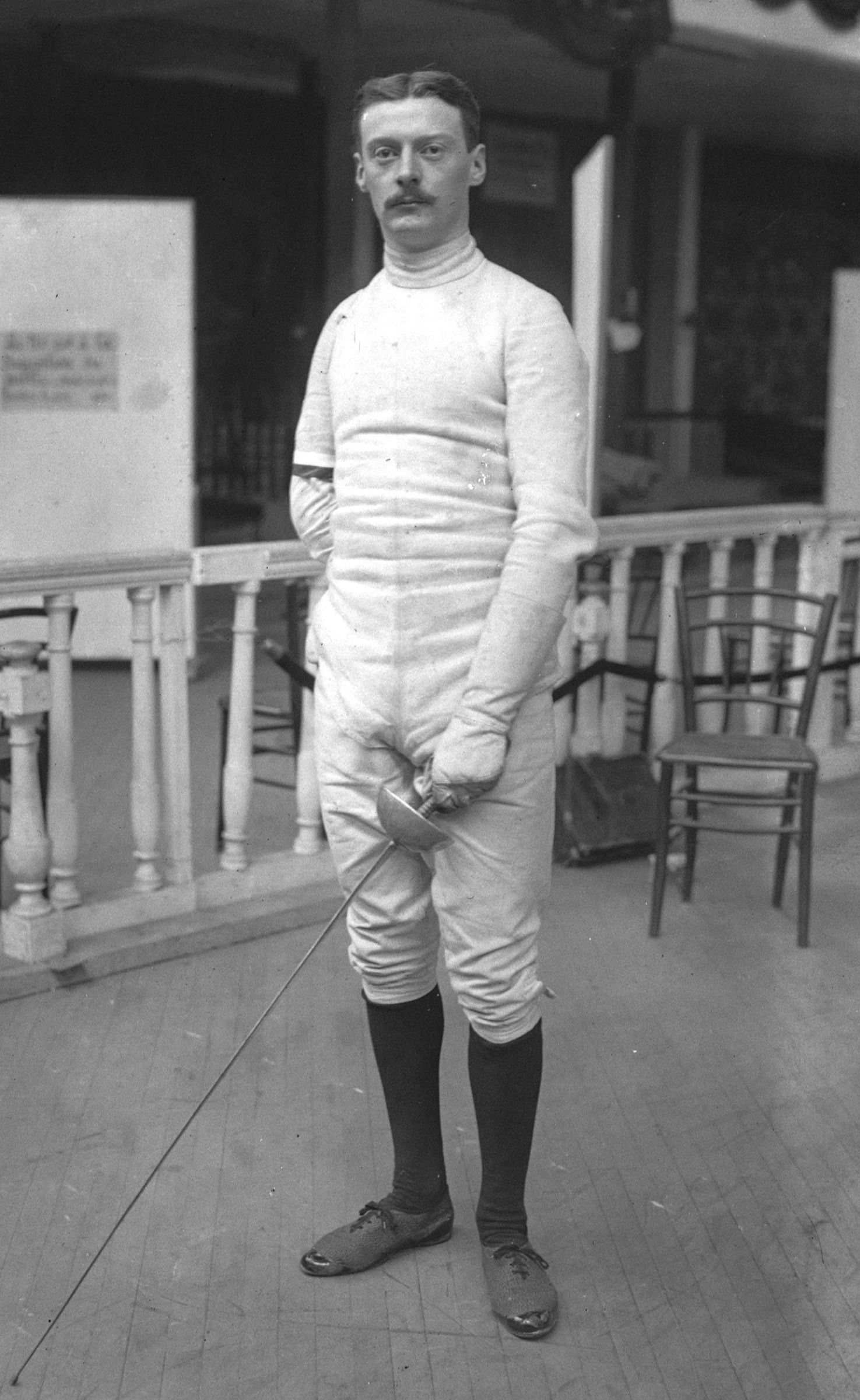
- Gold medalist Lucien Gaudin
- Venue: Schermzaal
- Dates: 6–7 August 1928
- Competitors: 59 from 22 nations

Medalists
1st place, gold medalist(s)		Lucien Gaudin; France
2nd place, silver medalist(s)		Georges Buchard; France
3rd place, bronze medalist(s)		George Calnan; United States

The men's épée was one of seven fencing events on the Fencing at the 1928 Summer Olympics programme. It was the seventh appearance of the event. The competition was held from 6 August 1928 to 7 August 1928. 59 fencers from 22 nations competed. Each nation could have up to three fencers. The event was won by Lucien Gaudin of France, the nation's third victory in the individual men's épée—taking sole possession of most among nations above Cuba and Belgium, each at two. Gaudin was the second man to win both the foil and épée events at a single Games. It was the third consecutive Games at which France reached the podium in the event. Two Frenchman had reached the head-to-head final; Gaudin won over Georges Buchard, who received silver. Bronze in 1928 went to American George Calnan, the nation's first medal in the event.

== Background ==
This was the seventh appearance of the event, which was not held at the first Games in 1896 (with only foil and sabre events held) but has been held at every Summer Olympics since 1900.

Six of the 12 finalists from the 1924 Games returned: gold medalist (and 1920 finalist) Charles Delporte of Belgium, bronze medalist Nils Hellsten of Sweden, fifth-place finisher (and 1920 gold medalist) Armand Massard of France, seventh-place finisher Georges Buchard of France, seventh-place finisher Léon Tom of Belgium, and ninth-place finisher Peter Ryefelt of Denmark. Buchard was the reigning (1927) World Champion; his countryman Lucien Gaudin was the 1921 World Champion. The two were favored in the event.

Bulgaria, Chile, Finland, Mexico, and Romania each made their debut in the event. Belgium, Great Britain, and the United States each appeared for the sixth time, tied for most among nations.

== Competition format ==
The competition format was unusual. It began with the same general four-round, pool-play format in use since 1908 (though with some modifications). However, it added an "extra final" medal round which placed the top four finishers in the "final" into a single-elimination bracket with a bronze medal bout. In each round before the "extra final", each pool held a round-robin; however, the number of touches changed by round. Double-touches counted as touches against both fencers, and both fencers could lose a bout if a double-touch resulted in each reaching the prescribed number of touches against. There were no barrages.

- First round: 6 pools of between 9 and 10 fencers each. Bouts were to 1 touch. The 6 fencers in each pool with the most wins advanced to the quarterfinals.
- Quarterfinals: 3 pools of 12 fencers each. Bouts were to 1 touch. The 6 fencers in each pool with the most wins advanced to the semifinals.
- Semifinals: 2 pools of 9 fencers each. Bouts were to 2 touches. The 5 fencers in each pool with the most wins advanced to the final.
- Final: 1 pool of 10 fencers. Bouts were to 2 touches. The top 4 fencers advanced to the "extra final" medal round.
- Extra final: A four-fencer, single-elimination bracket. The #1 seed faced the #4 seed, and the #2 vs. the #3 in a semifinal round. The winners of those two bouts reached the gold medal final, while the losers of the two semifinals went to the bronze medal bout.

== Schedule ==
Date	Time	Round
Monday, 6 August 1928	9:00; 13:30; 16:30	Round 1 Quarterfinals; Semifinals
Tuesday, 7 August 1928		Final; Extra final

== Results ==
Source: Official results; De Wael

=== Round 1 ===
Each pool was a round-robin. Bouts were to one touch, with double-losses possible. The top six fencers in each pool advanced to the second round.

==== Pool A ====
Rank	Fencer	Nation	Wins	Notes
1	Domingo García	Spain	7	Q
2	Charles Biscoe	Great Britain	6	Q
3	Saul Moyal	Egypt	6	Q
4	Henrique da Silveira	Portugal	5	Q
5	Hans Halberstadt	Germany	5	Q
6	Charles Debeur	Belgium	5	Q
7	Ottó Hátszeghy	Hungary	3	
7	Luis Hernández	Mexico	3	
9	Sigurd Akre-Aas	Norway	1	
9	Gunnar Cederschiöld	Sweden	1	

==== Pool B ====
Rank	Fencer	Nation	Wins	Notes
1	Nils Hellsten	Sweden	7	Q
2	George Calnan	United States	7	Q
3	Eugène Empeyta	Switzerland	6	Q
4	Ivan Osiier	Denmark	6	Q
5	János Hajdú	Hungary	5	Q
6	Fritz Jack	Germany	3	Q
7	František Kříž	Czechoslovakia	3	
7	Pieter Mijer	Netherlands	3	
9	Torvald Appelroth	Finland	2	
9	Gheorghe Caranfil	Romania	2	

==== Pool C ====
Rank	Fencer	Nation	Wins	Notes
1	Salvator Cicurel	Egypt	6	Q
2	Paulo Leal	Portugal	6	Q
3	Jens Berthelsen	Denmark	6	Q
4	Willem Driebergen	Netherlands	5	Q
5	József Rády	Hungary	4	Q
6	Gustaf Dyrssen	Sweden	4	Q
7	Fidel González	Spain	4	
7	Raoul Heide	Norway	4	
7	Antonio Villamil	Argentina	4	
10	Edward Willis Barnett	United States	1	

==== Pool D ====
Rank	Fencer	Nation	Wins	Notes
1	Léon Tom	Belgium	6	Q
2	Armand Massard	France	6	Q
3	Răzvan Penescu	Romania	6	Q
4	Peter Ryefelt	Denmark	5	Q
5	Oscar Martínez	Argentina	5	Q
6	Allen Milner	United States	4	Q
7	Jan Černohorský	Czechoslovakia	4	
8	Konstantinos Bembis	Greece	3	
9	Adrianus de Jong	Netherlands	2	
10	Frithjof Lorentzen	Norway	1	

==== Pool E ====
Rank	Fencer	Nation	Wins	Notes
1	Lucien Gaudin	France	9	Q
2	Édouard Fitting	Switzerland	6	Q
3	Charles Delporte	Belgium	6	Q
4	Theodor Fischer	Germany	4	Q
5	Frederico Paredes	Portugal	4	Q
6	Bertie Childs	Great Britain	3	Q
7	Dan Gheorghiu	Romania	3	
8	Georgios Ambet	Greece	2	
8	Elie Adda	Egypt	2	
10	José Llauro	Argentina	1	

==== Pool F ====
Rank	Fencer	Nation	Wins	Notes
1	Georges Buchard	France	7	Q
2	Henri Jacquet	Switzerland	6	Q
3	Martin Holt	Great Britain	6	Q
4	Tryfon Triantafyllakos	Greece	4	Q
5	Pedro Mercado	Mexico	3	Q
6	Josef Jungmann	Czechoslovakia	3	Q
7	Tomás Goyoaga	Chile	3	
8	Dimitar Vasilev	Bulgaria	2	
8	Lauri Kettunen	Finland	2	

=== Quarterfinals ===
Each pool was a round-robin. Bouts were to one touch, with double-losses possible. The top six fencers in each pool advanced to the semifinals.

==== Quarterfinal A ====
Rank	Fencer	Nation	Wins	Notes
1	Lucien Gaudin	France	9	Q
2	Frederico Paredes	Portugal	8	Q
3	Hans Halberstadt	Germany	7	Q
4	Saul Moyal	Egypt	7	Q
5	Willem Driebergen	Netherlands	6	Q
6	Charles Debeur	Belgium	5	Q
7	Henri Jacquet	Switzerland	5	
8	Gustaf Dyrssen	Sweden	4	
8	Răzvan Penescu	Romania	4	
10	Oscar Martínez	Argentina	2	
10	Peter Ryefelt	Denmark	2	
12	Martin Holt	Great Britain	2	

==== Quarterfinal B ====
Rank	Fencer	Nation	Wins	Notes
1	Jens Berthelsen	Denmark	8	Q
2	Léon Tom	Belgium	7	Q
3	Georges Buchard	France	6	Q
4	Allen Milner	United States	6	Q
5	Nils Hellsten	Sweden	6	Q
6	József Rády	Hungary	6	Q
7	Paulo Leal	Portugal	6	
8	Josef Jungmann	Czechoslovakia	5	
9	Tryfon Triantafyllakos	Greece	4	
9	Édouard Fitting	Switzerland	4	
11	Bertie Childs	Great Britain	3	
12	Theodor Fischer	Germany	1	

==== Quarterfinal C ====
Rank	Fencer	Nation	Wins	Notes
1	Salvator Cicurel	Egypt	8	Q
2	George Calnan	United States	8	Q
3	Ivan Osiier	Denmark	7	Q
4	Armand Massard	France	7	Q
5	Charles Delporte	Belgium	7	Q
6	Eugène Empeyta	Switzerland	5	Q
7	Domingo García	Spain	5	
7	Henrique da Silveira	Portugal	5	
9	Fritz Jack	Germany	4	
10	János Hajdú	Hungary	3	
10	Charles Biscoe	Great Britain	3	
12	Pedro Mercado	Mexico	2	

=== Semifinals ===
Each pool was a round-robin. Bouts were to two touches, with double-losses possible. The top five fencers in each pool advanced to the final.

==== Semifinal A ====
Rank	Fencer	Nation	Wins	Notes
1	Lucien Gaudin	France	6	Q
2	Léon Tom	Belgium	5	Q
3	Charles Delporte	Belgium	5	Q
4	George Calnan	United States	4	Q
5	Saul Moyal	Egypt	4	Q
6	Willem Driebergen	Netherlands	3	
7	Ivan Osiier	Denmark	3	
8	Eugène Empeyta	Switzerland	2	
9	József Rády	Hungary	2	

==== Semifinal B ====
Rank	Fencer	Nation	Wins	Notes
1	Georges Buchard	France	6	Q
2	Nils Hellsten	Sweden	6	Q
3	Salvator Cicurel	Egypt	5	Q
4	Charles Debeur	Belgium	4	Q
5	Allen Milner	United States	4	Q
6	Armand Massard	France	4	
7	Jens Berthelsen	Denmark	3	
8	Frederico Paredes	Portugal	3	
9	Hans Halberstadt	Germany	0	

=== Final ===
The final was a round-robin. Bouts were to two touches, with double-losses possible. The top four advanced to the "extra final" or medal round.

Rank	Fencer	Nation	Wins	Notes
1	Lucien Gaudin	France	8	Q
2	Georges Buchard	France	7	Q
3	George Calnan	United States	6	Q
4	Léon Tom	Belgium	6	Q
5	Nils Hellsten	Sweden	5	
6	Charles Delporte	Belgium	4	
7	Charles Debeur	Belgium	3	
7	Salvator Cicurel	Egypt	3	
9	Allen Milner	United States	1	
10	Saul Moyal	Egypt	1	

=== Extra final ===
The "extra final" round was a two-round single elimination tournament with a third-place match: that is, the four fencers competed in two semifinals, with the winners playing a gold medal bout and the losers playing a bronze medal bout. The bouts were to 10 touches, but the winner had to win by at least 2 or the bout continued.

Semifinals
1	Lucien Gaudin (FRA)	10
4	Léon Tom (BEL)	6
2	Georges Buchard (FRA)	13
3	George Calnan (USA)	11

Gold medal bout
1	Lucien Gaudin (FRA)	10
2	Georges Buchard (FRA)	6
Bronze medal bout
4	Léon Tom (BEL)	6
3	George Calnan (USA)	10

== Results summary ==
Rank	Fencer	Nation	Round 1	Quarterfinals	Semifinals	Final	Medal semifinal	Medal final
1st place, gold medalist(s)	Lucien Gaudin	France	1st	1st	1st	1st	Tom (BEL); W 10–6	Buchard (FRA); W 10–6
2nd place, silver medalist(s)	Georges Buchard	France	1st	3rd	1st	2nd	Calnan (USA); W 13–11	Gaudin (FRA); L 10–6
3rd place, bronze medalist(s)	George Calnan	United States	2nd	2nd	4th	3rd	Buchard (FRA); L 13–11	Tom (BEL); W 10–6
4	Léon Tom	Belgium	1st	2nd	2nd	4th	Gaudin (FRA); L 10–6	Calnan (USA); L 10–6
5	Nils Hellsten	Sweden	1st	5th	2nd	5th	Did not advance	
6	Charles Delporte	Belgium	3rd	5th	3rd	6th	Did not advance	
7	Charles Debeur	Belgium	6th	6th	4th	7th	Did not advance	
7	Salvator Cicurel	Egypt	1st	1st	3rd	7th	Did not advance	
9	Allen Milner	United States	6th	4th	5th	9th	Did not advance	
10	Saul Moyal	Egypt	3rd	4th	5th	10th	Did not advance	
11	Willem Driebergen	Netherlands	4th	5th	6th	Did not advance		
11	Armand Massard	France	2nd	4th	6th	Did not advance		
13	Jens Berthelsen	Denmark	3rd	1st	7th	Did not advance		
13	Ivan Osiier	Denmark	4th	3rd	7th	Did not advance		
15	Eugène Empeyta	Switzerland	3rd	6th	8th	Did not advance		
15	Frederico Paredes	Portugal	5th	2nd	8th	Did not advance		
17	Hans Halberstadt	Germany	5th	3rd	9th	Did not advance		
17	József Rády	Hungary	5th	6th	9th	Did not advance		
19	Domingo García	Spain	1st	7th	Did not advance			
19	Henri Jacquet	Switzerland	2nd	7th	Did not advance			
19	Paulo Leal	Portugal	2nd	7th	Did not advance			
19	Henrique da Silveira	Portugal	4th	7th	Did not advance			
23	Gustaf Dyrssen	Sweden	6th	8th	Did not advance			
23	Josef Jungmann	Czechoslovakia	6th	8th	Did not advance			
23	Răzvan Penescu	Romania	3rd	8th	Did not advance			
26	Édouard Fitting	Switzerland	2nd	9th	Did not advance			
26	Fritz Jack	Germany	6th	9th	Did not advance			
26	Tryfon Triantafyllakos	Greece	4th	9th	Did not advance			
29	Charles Biscoe	Great Britain	2nd	10th	Did not advance			
29	János Hajdú	Hungary	5th	10th	Did not advance			
29	Oscar Martínez	Argentina	5th	10th	Did not advance			
29	Peter Ryefelt	Denmark	4th	10th	Did not advance			
33	Bertie Childs	Great Britain	6th	11th	Did not advance			
34	Theodor Fischer	Germany	4th	12th	Did not advance			
34	Martin Holt	Great Britain	3rd	12th	Did not advance			
34	Pedro Mercado	Mexico	5th	12th	Did not advance			
37	Jan Černohorský	Czechoslovakia	7th	Did not advance				
37	Dan Gheorghiu	Romania	7th	Did not advance				
37	Fidel González	Spain	7th	Did not advance				
37	Tomás Goyoaga	Chile	7th	Did not advance				
37	Ottó Hátszeghy	Hungary	7th	Did not advance				
37	Raoul Heide	Norway	7th	Did not advance				
37	Luis Hernández	Mexico	7th	Did not advance				
37	František Kříž	Czechoslovakia	7th	Did not advance				
37	Pieter Mijer	Netherlands	7th	Did not advance				
37	Antonio Villamil	Argentina	7th	Did not advance				
47	Elie Adda	Egypt	8th	Did not advance				
47	Georgios Ambet	Greece	8th	Did not advance				
47	Konstantinos Bembis	Greece	8th	Did not advance				
47	Lauri Kettunen	Finland	8th	Did not advance				
47	Dimitar Vasilev	Bulgaria	8th	Did not advance				
52	Sigurd Akre-Aas	Norway	9th	Did not advance				
52	Torvald Appelroth	Finland	9th	Did not advance				
52	Gheorghe Caranfil	Romania	9th	Did not advance				
52	Gunnar Cederschiöld	Sweden	9th	Did not advance				
52	Adrianus de Jong	Netherlands	9th	Did not advance				
57	Edward Willis Barnett	United States	10th	Did not advance				
57	José Llauro	Argentina	10th	Did not advance				
57	Frithjof Lorentzen	Norway	10th	Did not advance				
