= Fencing at the 1928 Summer Olympics – Men's team épée =

Men's team épée at the Games of the IX Olympiad
- Venue: Schermzaal
- Dates: 3–5 August 1928
- Competitors: 93 from 18 nations

Medalists
1st place, gold medalist(s)		Giulio Basletta; Marcello Bertinetti; Giancarlo Cornaggia-Medici; Carlo Agostoni; Renzo Minoli; Franco Riccardi	Italy
2nd place, silver medalist(s)		Georges Buchard; Gaston Amson; Émile Cornic; Bernard Schmetz; René Barbier	France
3rd place, bronze medalist(s)		Paulo Leal; Mário de Noronha; Jorge de Paiva; Frederico Paredes; João Sassetti; Henrique da Silveira	Portugal

The men's team épée was one of seven fencing events on the Fencing at the 1928 Summer Olympics programme. It was the fifth appearance of the event. The competition was held from 3 August 1928 to 5 August 1928. 93 fencers from 18 nations competed.

== Rosters ==
Belgium

- Émile Barbier
- Balthazar De Beukelaer
- Charles Delporte
- Charles Debeur
- Léon Tom
- Georges Dambois

Czechoslovakia

- Martin Harden
- Josef Jungmann
- František Kříž
- Jan Tille
- Miroslav Beznoska
- Jan Černohorský

Denmark

- Ivan Osiier
- Jens Berthelsen
- Otto Bærentzen
- Peter Ryefelt
- Johan Praem

Egypt

- Elie Adda
- Joseph Misrahi
- Mohamed Charaoui
- Saul Moyal
- Salvator Cicurel

France

- Georges Buchard
- Gaston Amson
- Émile Cornic
- Bernard Schmetz
- René Barbier

Germany

- Theodor Fischer
- Fritz Gazzera
- Hans Halberstadt
- Fritz Jack

Great Britain

- Charles Biscoe
- Bertie Childs
- David Drury
- Martin Holt

Greece

- Konstantinos Botasis
- Tryfon Triantafyllakos
- Konstantinos Nikolopoulos
- Georgios Ambet
- Konstantinos Bembis

Hungary

- József Rády
- János Hajdú
- Albert Bógathy
- György Piller-Jekelfalussy
- Ottó Hátszeghy

Italy

- Giulio Basletta
- Marcello Bertinetti
- Giancarlo Cornaggia-Medici
- Carlo Agostoni
- Renzo Minoli
- Franco Riccardi

Netherlands

- Leonard Kuypers
- Arie de Jong
- Henri Wijnoldy-Daniëls
- Willem Driebergen
- Alfred Labouchere
- Karel, Jonkheer van den Brandeler

Norway

- Sigurd Akre-Aas
- Raoul Heide
- Frithjof Lorentzen
- Jacob Bergsland

Portugal

- Paulo Leal
- Mário de Noronha
- Jorge de Paiva
- Frederico Paredes
- João Sassetti
- Henrique da Silveira

Romania

- Mihai Savu
- Gheorghe Caranfil
- Răzvan Penescu
- Dan Gheorghiu
- Ion Rudeanu

Spain

- Juan Delgado
- Domingo García
- Diego Díez
- Félix de Pomés
- Fidel González

Sweden

- Nils Hellsten
- Sidney Stranne
- Gunnar Cederschiöld
- Bertil Uggla

Switzerland

- Édouard Fitting
- Henri Jacquet
- Frédéric Fitting
- Eugène Empeyta
- John Albaret
- Paul de Graffenried

United States

- Arthur Lyon
- George Calnan
- Allen Milner
- Harold Rayner
- Henry Breckinridge
- Edward Barnett

== Results ==
Source: Official results; De Wael

=== Round 1 ===
Each pool was a round-robin (with matches not being held where unnecessary to the overall result). Bouts were to two touches, and each fencer from one nation had a bout against each from the opponent. The nation which won the most individual bouts took the team match (with total touches as the tie-breaker if the teams split 8-8). The top two nations in each pool advanced to the second round.

Pool A
Rank	Nation	Wins	Losses	Qual.
1	France	2	0	Q
2	Czechoslovakia	1	1	Q
3	Greece	0	2	

Pool B
Rank	Nation	Wins	Losses	Qual.
1	Belgium	1	0	Q
2	Spain	1	0	Q
3	Denmark	0	2	

Pool C
Rank	Nation	Wins	Losses	Qual.
1	Italy	0	0	Q

Pool D
Rank	Nation	Wins	Losses	Qual.
1	Portugal	2	0	Q
2	Netherlands	1	1	Q
3	Sweden	0	2	

Pool E
Rank	Nation	Wins	Losses	Qual.
1	Switzerland	1 (20)	1	Q
2	Norway	1 (16)	1	Q
3	Great Britain	1 (10)	1	

Pool F
Rank	Nation	Wins	Losses	Qual.
1	United States	2	0	Q
2	Egypt	1	1	Q
3	Hungary	0	2	

Pool G
Rank	Nation	Wins	Losses	Qual.
1	Germany	1	0	Q
2	Romania	0	1	Q

=== Round 2 ===
Each pool was a round-robin (with matches not being held where unnecessary to the overall result). Bouts were to two touches, and each fencer from one nation had a bout against each from the opponent. The nation which won the most individual bouts took the team match (with total touches as the tie-breaker if the teams split 8-8). The top two nations in each pool advanced to the second round.

Pool A
Rank	Nation	Wins	Losses	Qual.
1	Belgium	2	0	Q
2	Czechoslovakia	1	1	Q
3	Romania	0	2	

Pool B
Rank	Nation	Wins	Losses	Qual.
1	Italy	3	0	Q
2	Spain	1 1/2	1 1/2	Q
3	Egypt	1	2	
4	Germany	1/2	2 1/2	

Pool C
Rank	Nation	Wins	Losses	Qual.
1	France	2	0	Q
2	Netherlands	1	1	Q
3	Switzerland	0	2	

Pool D
Rank	Nation	Wins	Losses	Qual.
1	Portugal	2	0	Q
2	United States	1	1	Q
3	Norway	0	2	

=== Semifinals ===
Each pool was a round-robin (with matches not being held where unnecessary to the overall result). Bouts were to two touches, and each fencer from one nation had a bout against each from the opponent. The nation which won the most individual bouts took the team match (with total touches as the tie-breaker if the teams split 8-8). The top two nations in each pool advanced to the second round.

Pool A
Rank	Nation	Wins	Losses	Qual.
1	France	3	0	Q
2	Belgium	2	1	Q
3	United States	1	2	
4	Spain	0	3	

Pool B
Rank	Nation	Wins	Losses	Qual.
1	Italy	3	0	Q
2	Portugal	2	1	Q
3	Czechoslovakia	1	2	
4	Netherlands	0	3	

=== Final ===
The final was a round-robin. Bouts were to two touches, and each fencer from one nation had a bout against each from the opponent. The nation which won the most individual bouts took the team match (with total touches as the tie-breaker if the teams split 8-8).

Rank	Nation	Wins	Losses
1st place, gold medalist(s)	Italy	3	0
2nd place, silver medalist(s)	France	2	1
3rd place, bronze medalist(s)	Portugal	1	2
4	Belgium	0	3
