= Fencing at the 1928 Summer Olympics – Men's team foil =

Men's team foil at the Games of the IX Olympiad
- Venue: Schermzaal
- Dates: 29–30 July 1928
- Competitors: 88 from 16 nations

Medalists
1st place, gold medalist(s)		Ugo Pignotti; Giulio Gaudini; Giorgio Pessina; Gioacchino Guaragna; Oreste Puliti; Giorgio Chiavacci	Italy
2nd place, silver medalist(s)		Philippe Cattiau; Roger Ducret; André Labatut; Lucien Gaudin; Raymond Flacher; André Gaboriaud	France
3rd place, bronze medalist(s)		Roberto Larraz; Raúl Anganuzzi; Luis Lucchetti; Héctor Lucchetti; Carmelo Camet	Argentina

The men's team foil was one of seven fencing events on the Fencing at the 1928 Summer Olympics programme. It was the fourth appearance of the event. The competition was held from 29 July 1928 to 30 July 1928. 88 fencers from 16 nations competed.

== Rosters ==
Argentina

- Roberto Larraz
- Raúl Anganuzzi
- Luis Lucchetti
- Héctor Lucchetti
- Carmelo Camet

Austria

- Richard Brünner
- Ernst Baylon
- Kurt Ettinger
- Hans Lion
- Hans Schönbaumsfeld
- Rudolf Berger

Belgium

- Max Janlet
- Pierre Pêcher
- Raymond Bru
- Albert De Roocker
- Jean Verbrugge
- Charles Crahay

Denmark

- Ivan Osiier
- Jens Berthelsen
- Kim Bærentzen
- Johan Praem

Egypt

- Joseph Misrahi
- Abu Bakr Ratib
- Mahmoud Abdin
- Saul Moyal
- Salvator Cicurel

France

- Philippe Cattiau
- Roger Ducret
- André Labatut
- Lucien Gaudin
- Raymond Flacher
- André Gaboriaud

Germany

- Erwin Casmir
- Fritz Gazzera
- Julius Thomson
- Wilhelm Löffler
- August Heim
- Heinrich Moos

Great Britain

- Thomas Wand-Tetley
- Robert Montgomerie
- Frederick Sherriff
- Denis Pearce
- Charles Simey
- Jack Evan James

Hungary

- Ödön von Tersztyánszky
- György Rozgonyi
- György Piller-Jekelfalussy
- József Rády
- Gusztáv Kálniczky
- Péter Tóth

Italy

- Ugo Pignotti
- Giulio Gaudini
- Giorgio Pessina
- Gioacchino Guaragna
- Oreste Puliti
- Giorgio Chiavacci

Netherlands

- Frans Mosman
- Doris de Jong
- Nicolaas Nederpeld
- Paul Kunze
- Wouter Brouwer
- Otto Schiff

Norway

- Jacob Bergsland
- Johan Falkenberg
- Frithjof Lorentzen
- Sigurd Akre-Aas

Romania

- Nicolae Caranfil
- Dan Gheorghiu
- Gheorghe Caranfil
- Mihai Savu
- Ion Rudeanu

Spain

- Diego Díez
- Domingo García
- Juan Delgado
- Félix de Pomés
- Fernando García

Switzerland

- Édouard Fitting
- Frédéric Fitting
- Eugène Empeyta
- John Albaret
- Michel Fauconnet
- Jean de Bardel

United States

- George Calnan
- René Peroy
- Joe Levis
- Harold Rayner
- Henry Breckinridge
- Dernell Every

== Results ==
Source: Official results; De Wael

=== Round 1 ===
Each pool was a round-robin. Bouts were to five touches, and each fencer from one nation had a bout against each from the opponent. The nation which won the most individual bouts took the team bout (with total touches as the tie-breaker if the teams split 8-8). The top two nations in each pool advanced to the second round.

Pool A
Rank	Nation	Wins	Qual.
1	France	3	Q
2	Denmark	2	Q
3	Germany	1	
4	Romania	0	

Pool B
Rank	Nation	Wins	Qual.
1	Argentina	3	Q
2	Belgium	2	Q
3	Spain	1	
4	Norway	0	

Pool C
Rank	Nation	Wins	Qual.
1	Netherlands	1	Q
2	Hungary	0	Q

Pool D
Rank	Nation	Wins	Qual.
1	Italy	2	Q
2	Austria	1	Q
3	Great Britain	0	

Pool E
Rank	Nation	Wins	Qual.
1	United States	2	Q
2	Switzerland	1	Q
3	Egypt	0	

=== Round 2 ===
Each pool was a round-robin. Bouts were to five touches, and each fencer from one nation had a bout against each from the opponent. The nation which won the most individual bouts took the team bout (with total touches as the tie-breaker if the teams split 8-8). The top two nations in each pool advanced to the semifinals.

Pool A
Rank	Nation	Wins	Qual.
1	France	3	Q
2	Belgium	2	Q
3	Austria	1	
4	Switzerland	0	

Pool B
Rank	Nation	Wins	Qual.
1	United States	2	Q
2	Argentina	1	Q
3	Netherlands	0	

Pool C
Rank	Nation	Wins	Qual.
1	Italy	2	Q
2	Hungary	1	Q
3	Denmark	0	

=== Semifinals ===
Each pool was a round-robin. Bouts were to five touches, and each fencer from one nation had a bout against each from the opponent. The nation which won the most individual bouts took the team bout (with total touches as the tie-breaker if the teams split 8-8). The top two nations in each pool advanced to the final. In the first pool, the United States lost the first two matches making the match between France and Italy unnecessary as both would advance regardless of the result. Similarly, Hungary lost both the first two matches of the second pool, so the third match (between Argentina and Belgium) was unnecessary.

Pool A
Rank	Nation	Wins	Qual.
1	France	1	Q
1	Italy	1	Q
3	United States	0	

Pool B
Rank	Nation	Wins	Qual.
1	Argentina	1	Q
1	Belgium	1	Q
3	Hungary	0	

=== Final ===
The final was a round-robin. Bouts were to five touches, and each fencer from one nation had a bout against each from the opponent. The nation which won the most individual bouts took the team bout (with total touches as the tie-breaker if the teams split 8-8). The match between France and Belgium finished 8(62) to 8(62).

Rank	Nation	Wins
1st place, gold medalist(s)	Italy	3
2nd place, silver medalist(s)	France	1 1/2
3rd place, bronze medalist(s)	Argentina	1
4	Belgium	1/2
