= Fencing at the 1928 Summer Olympics =

Coordinates: 52.3432°N 4.8566°E

Fencing at the Games of the IX Olympiad

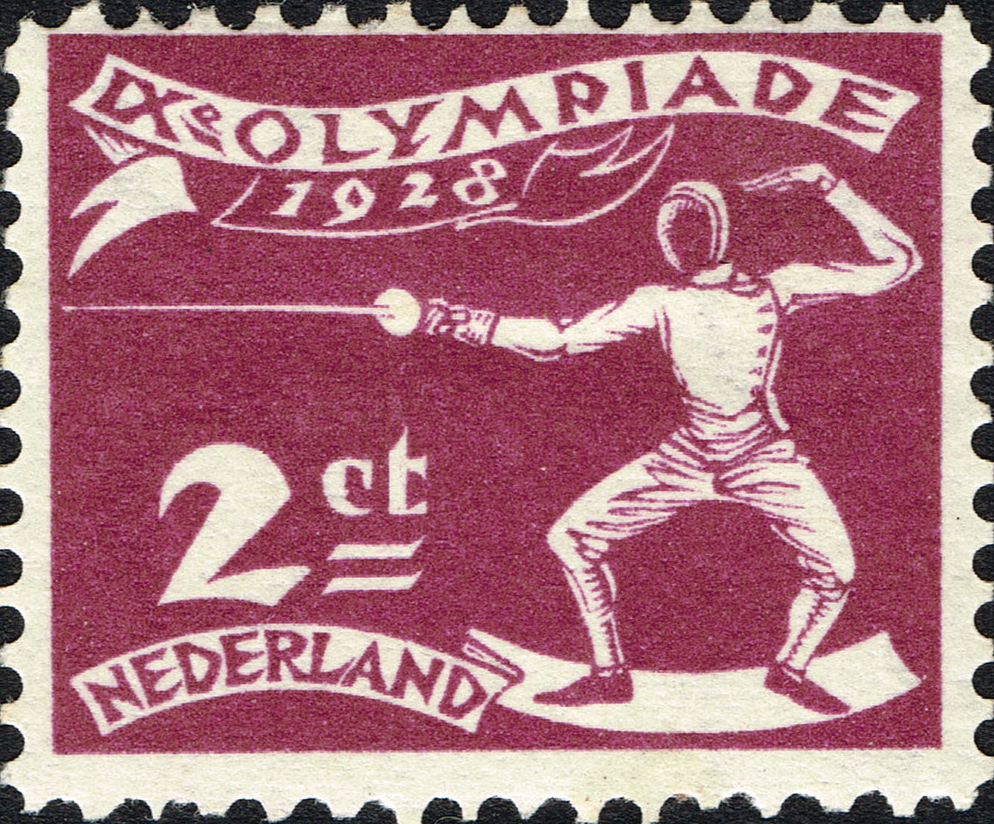
Fencing at the 1928 Summer Olympics on a stamp of the Netherlands

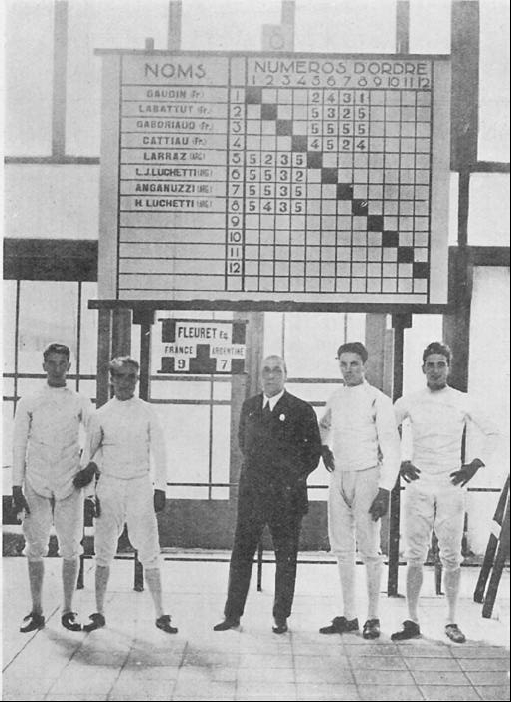
The Argentinian foil team at the 1928 Summer Olympics. They won the bronze medal.

At the 1928 Summer Olympics in Amsterdam, seven fencing events were contested, six for men and one for women.

== Medal summary ==
=== Men's events ===
Event	Gold	Silver	Bronze
individual épée	Lucien Gaudin; France	Georges Buchard; France	George Calnan; United States
team épée	Italy; Giulio Basletta; Marcello Bertinetti; Giancarlo Cornaggia-Medici; Carlo Agostoni; Renzo Minoli; Franco Riccardi	France; Georges Buchard; Gaston Amson; Émile Cornic; Bernard Schmetz; René Barbier	Portugal; Paulo Leal; Mário de Noronha; Jorge de Paiva; Frederico Paredes; João Sassetti; Henrique da Silveira
individual foil	Lucien Gaudin; France	Erwin Casmir; Germany	Giulio Gaudini; Italy
team foil	Italy; Ugo Pignotti; Giulio Gaudini; Giorgio Pessina; Gioachino Guaragna; Oreste Puliti; Giorgio Chiavacci	France; Philippe Cattiau; Roger Ducret; André Labattut; Lucien Gaudin; Raymond Flacher; André Gaboriaud	Argentina; Roberto Larraz; Raúl Anganuzzi; Luis Lucchetti; Héctor Lucchetti; Carmelo Camet
individual sabre	Ödön Tersztyánszky; Hungary	Attila Petschauer; Hungary	Bino Bini; Italy
team sabre	Hungary; Ödön von Tersztyánszky; János Garay; Attila Petschauer; József Rády; Sándor Gombos; Gyula Glykais	Italy; Bino Bini; Oreste Puliti; Giulio Sarrocchi; Renato Anselmi; Emilio Salafia; Gustavo Marzi	Poland; Adam Papée; Tadeusz Friedrich; Kazimierz Laskowski; Władysław Segda; Aleksander Małecki; Jerzy Zabielski

=== Women's events ===
Event	Gold	Silver	Bronze
individual foil	Helene Mayer; Germany	Muriel Freeman; Great Britain	Olga Oelkers; Germany

== Participating nations ==
A total of 259 fencers (232 men, 27 women) from 27 nations competed at the Amsterdam Games:

- Argentina (9)
- Austria (6)
- Belgium (21)
- Bulgaria (2)
- Chile (6)
- Czechoslovakia (7)
- Denmark (10)
- Egypt (8)
- Finland (2)
- France (20)
- Germany (13)
- Great Britain (19)
- Greece (5)
- Hungary (17)
- Italy (18)
- Mexico (2)
- Netherlands (20)
- Norway (5)
- Poland (6)
- Portugal (7)
- Romania (8)
- Spain (9)
- Sweden (8)
- Switzerland (9)
- Turkey (4)
- United States (16)
- Yugoslavia (2)

== Medal table ==
Rank	Nation	Gold	Silver	Bronze	Total
1	France	2	3	0	5
2	Italy	2	1	2	5
3	Hungary	2	1	0	3
4	Germany	1	1	1	3
5	Great Britain	0	1	0	1
6	Argentina	0	0	1	1
6	Poland	0	0	1	1
6	Portugal	0	0	1	1
6	United States	0	0	1	1
Totals (9 entries)		7	7	7	21
