= Portugal at the 1928 Summer Olympics =

- IOC code: POR
- NOC: Olympic Committee of Portugal

in Amsterdam
- Competitors: 31 in 8 sports
- Officials: 9
- Medals Ranked 32nd: Gold 0 Silver 0 Bronze 1 Total 1

Summer Olympics appearances (overview)
- 1912; 1920; 1924; 1928; 1932; 1936; 1948; 1952; 1956; 1960; 1964; 1968; 1972; 1976; 1980; 1984; 1988; 1992; 1996; 2000; 2004; 2008; 2012; 2016; 2020; 2024

Portugal competed at the 1928 Summer Olympics in Amsterdam, Netherlands. It was the nation's fourth appearance at the Olympics, after debuting in 1912.

A delegation of thirty-one competitors participated in eight sports, with the fencing team grabbing the second Olympic medal for Portugal. Most of the competitors were part of the debutant Portuguese Olympic football team.

== Medalists ==
Medal	Name	Sport	Event	Date
Bronze	Henrique da Silveira, Mário de Noronha, Jorge de Paiva, Paulo d'Eça Leal, Frederico Paredes, João Sassetti	Fencing	Men's team épée	August 5

== Athletics ==
Men's 100m:

- J. Artur Prata Rebelo de Lima — 1st round: 4th (12th heat)

Men's 200m:

- J. Artur Prata Rebelo de Lima — 1st round: 4th (13th heat)

Men's 3000m Steeplechase:

- Henrique Santos — qualifying round: 7th (2nd heat)

Men's 110m Hurdles:

- J. Palhares Costa — 1st round: 4th (9th heat)

== Equestrian ==
Men's Individual Jumping:

- L. Ivens Ferraz — 15th (4 faults)
- Hélder de Souza — 16th (4 faults)
- José Mouzinho — 19th (4 faults)

Men's Team Jumping:

- José Mouzinho, Hélder de Souza, L. Ivens Ferraz and J. Frois de Almeida — 6th (12 faults)

== Fencing ==
Men's Individual Foil:

- Sebastião Herédia — 1st round: 5th (poule 4)

Men's Individual Sword:

- Frederico Paredes — semifinalist (poule 5)
- Henrique da Silveira — 2nd round: non qualified (poule 3)
- Paulo d'Eça Leal — 2nd round: non qualified (poule 2)

Men's Team Sword:

- Frederico Paredes, Henrique da Silveira, João Sassetti, Jorge de Paiva, Mário de Noronha and Paulo d'Eça Leal — 3rd

== Football ==
Men's Tournament:

- Carlo Alves, Armando Martins, Augusto Silva, Óscar de Carvalho, César de Matos, Tamanqueiro, Anibal José, João Santos, José Manuel Martins, Liberto dos Santos, Valdemar Mota, Pepe, Ramos, António Roquete, Cipriano Santos, Tavares, Jorge Gomes Vieira and Vítor Silva — quarterfinalists (5th - 8th)

== Modern pentathlon ==
Men's Tournament:

- Sebastião de Freitas Branco de Herédia — 31st (133 points)
  1. Shooting — 36th (132 points)
  2. Swimming — 18th (6.01 min)
  3. Fencing — 20th
  4. Cross-country — 27th (16.40,2 min)
  5. Horse-riding — 32nd

== Sailing ==
Men's 6m:

- Frederico Guilherme Burnay, Ernesto Vieira de Mendonça, António Guedes de Herédia and Carlos Bleck — 12th

== Weightlifting ==
Men's Feather Weight (–60 kg):

- A. Pereira — 11th

== Wrestling ==
Men's Greco-Roman Feather Weight (58–60 kg):

- B. Esteves Araújo — 3rd round

== Officials ==
- Manuel da Costa Latino (chief of mission, athletics, equestrian, fencing, sailing)
- P. Duro (athletics)
- J. Formosinho Simões (equestrian, modern pentathlon, sailing)
- L. Ivens Ferraz (fencing)
- J. Frois de Almeida (fencing)
- R. Ayres de Magalhães (fencing)
- Hélder Martinez (fencing)
- Cardoso (fencing)
- C. de Mello (weightlifting)
- J. Pontes (weightlifting)
