= Romania at the 1928 Summer Olympics =

- IOC code: ROU
- NOC: Romanian Olympic Committee

in Amsterdam
- Competitors: 21 in 2 sports
- Medals: Gold 0 Silver 0 Bronze 0 Total 0

Summer Olympics appearances (overview)
- 1900; 1904–1920; 1924; 1928; 1932; 1936; 1948; 1952; 1956; 1960; 1964; 1968; 1972; 1976; 1980; 1984; 1988; 1992; 1996; 2000; 2004; 2008; 2012; 2016; 2020; 2024

Romania competed at the 1928 Summer Olympics in Amsterdam, Netherlands. 21 athletes (19 men and 2 women) competed in 16 events across two sports (athletics and fencing).

== Athletics ==
13 athletes (11 men and 2 women) competed for Romania in 11 athletic events.

Men - track and road events

Athlete	Event	Heat		Semifinal		Final	
Athlete	Event	Result	Rank	Result	Rank	Result	Rank
Ladislau Peter	100 m	unknown	3	Did not advance			
Ladislau Peter	200 m	unknown	6	Did not advance			
Lothar Albrich	110 m hurdles	unknown	4	Did not advance			
Otto Schöpp	110 m hurdles	unknown	5	Did not advance			
Vintilă Cristescu	Marathon	—N/a				DNF	

=== Men - field events ===
Athlete	Event	Qualification		Final	
Athlete	Event	Distance	Position	Distance	Position
Tiberiu Rusu	High jump	1.70	28	Did not advance	
Otto Schöpp	High jump	1.70	28	Did not advance	
Ion David	Shot put	12.82	16	Did not advance	
Alexandru Fritz	Shot put	12.55	19	Did not advance	
Ion David	Discus throw	37.49	28	Did not advance	
Otto Rottman	Javelin throw	50.93	27	Did not advance	

Men - Combined events – Decathlon

Athlete	Event	100 m	LJ	SP	HJ	400 m	110H	DT	PV	JT	1500 m	Final	Rank
Gheorghe Csegezi	Result	11.8	6.01	9.45	1.60	55.6	20.0	26.20	3.00	31.85	5:03.8	5081.605	27
Gheorghe Csegezi	Points	714.4	610.45	411	538	721.76	525	277.62	487	198.375	598.0	5081.605	27
Gheorghe Csegezi	Adjusted points	643	589	453	464	569	330	390	357	325	538	4658	27
Gheorghe Csegezi	Rank	16	29	36	28	23	29	33	21	27	13	4658	27
Ion Haidu	Result	12.2	5.74	10.51	1.60	59.4	20.4	31.59	—	—	—	DNF	
Ion Haidu	Points	619.2	544.30	517	538	578.88	487	482.44	—	—	—	DNF	
Ion Haidu	Adjusted points	567	531	516	464	429	300	496	—	—	—	DNF	
Ion Haidu	Rank	31	34	29	28	32	31	24	—	—	—	DNF	
Virgil Ioan	Result	12.4	—	—	—	—	—	—	—	—	—	DNF	
Virgil Ioan	Points	571.6	—	—	—	—	—	—	—	—	—	DNF	
Virgil Ioan	Adjusted points	531	—	—	—	—	—	—	—	—	—	DNF	
Virgil Ioan	Rank	34	—	—	—	—	—	—	—	—	—	DNF	

Women - field events

Athlete	Event	Qualification		Final	
Athlete	Event	Distance	Position	Distance	Position
Irina Orendi	High jump	1.35	20	Did not advance	
Berta Jikeli	Discus throw	28.19	18	Did not advance	

Key

- Note – Ranks given for track events are within the athlete's heat only
- Q = Qualified for the next round
- q = Qualified for the next round as a fastest loser or, in field events, by position without achieving the qualifying target
- NR = National record
- N/A = Round not applicable for the event
- Bye = Athlete not required to compete in round

== Fencing ==
Eight fencers, all men, represented Romania in 1928.

Athlete	Event	Round 1		Round 2		Semifinal		Final	
Athlete	Event	Wins	Rank	Wins	Rank	Wins	Rank	Wins	Rank
Gheorghe Caranfil	Men's épée	2	9	Did not advance					
Dan Gheorghiu	Men's épée	3	7	Did not advance					
Răzvan Penescu	Men's épée	6	3 Q	4	8	Did not advance			
Gheorghe Caranfil; Dan Gheorghiu; Răzvan Penescu; Ion Rudeanu; Mihai Savu	Men's team épée	0	2 Q	0	3	Did not advance			
Gheorghe Caranfil	Men's foil	0	7	—N/a		Did not advance			
Mihai Savu	Men's foil	4	3 Q	—N/a		3	5	Did not advance	
Gheorghe Caranfil; Nicolae Caranfil; Dan Gheorghiu; Ion Rudeanu; Mihai Savu	Men's team foil	0	4	Did not advance					
Denis Dolecsko	Men's sabre	2	3 Q	—N/a		1	7	Did not advance	
Mihai Raicu	Men's sabre	2	4	—N/a		Did not advance			
