= Theodor Fischer (fencer) =

German fencer

Personal information
- Nationality: German

Sport
- Country: Germany
- Sport: Fencing
- Event(s): Epee, foil
- Club: Dresdener Fechtclub
Medal record
Maccabiah Games
Silver medal – second place	1932 Palestine	Men's foil
Bronze medal – third place	1932 Palestine	Epee

Theodor Fischer was a German épée and foil fencer. He fenced in the 1928 Summer Olympics, and won two medals in fencing at the 1932 Maccabiah Games in Mandatory Palestine.

== Biography ==
Fischer competed in the individual and team épée events at the 1928 Summer Olympics. In each, Fischer was eliminated in the second round (the quarter-finals). He came in 12th in individual epee. He defeating reigning Olympic épée champion Charles Delporte from Belgium, Elie Adda of Egypt, Georgios Ambet of Greece, Josef Jungmann of Czechoslovakia, Frederico Paredes of Portugal, and lost to among others gold-medal-winning Lucien Gaudin of France, Bertie Childs of Great Britain, Édouard Fitting of Switzerland, and Dan Gheorghiu of Romania.

Fischer finished eighth at the 1928 German Fencing Championships. He fenced for Dresdener Fechtclub.

Fischer fenced at the 1932 Maccabiah Games in Mandatory Palestine, winning a silver medal in men's foil and a bronze medal in épée.

Fischer is deceased.
