= Carmelo Camet =

Argentine fencer

Olympic medal record

Representing Argentina

Men's fencing
Bronze medal – third place	1928 Amsterdam	Team foil

Carmelo Félix Camet (October 29, 1904 – July 22, 2007) was an Argentine fencer who competed in the Olympic Games in 1928. He was the son of Francisco Carmelo Camet, a fencer at the 1900 Summer Olympics who is sometimes considered to be Argentina's first participant at the Olympics. Trained as a lawyer, Carmelo Camet gained his training and love for fencing at an early age from his father. By the 1920s he had already won several tournaments and, in 1926, he won the Argentine national fencing championship.

Although Camet successfully completed all of the trials required of him by the nascent Argentine Olympic Committee, he did not attend the 1924 Summer Olympics in Paris, although his name was on the official register as a non-participant. After taking a brief break to finish his law degree, he was part of the Argentine fencing delegation sent to the 1928 Summer Olympics. There, as the substitute on the foil team foil, he won a bronze medal, Argentine's only medal in that sport as of 2008. Although he sat out the first two matches with Norway and Spain, he replaced Héctor Lucchetti during the matches against Belgium and all subsequent events. At the time of his death in 2007, in Buenos Aires, Camet was believed to be the world's oldest living Olympic competitor.

== Early life ==
Carmelo Camet was born in Mar del Plata on October 29, 1904, the son of Francisco Carmen Camet, a fencer at the 1900 Summer Olympics in Paris, and Clara Isa. The elder Camet, though officially an athlete from France, is considered by some to be Argentina's first Olympic participant. This is disputed, however, by those who claim that Horatio Torromé should hold this title as the first official Argentine representative. Carmelo had one brother, Carlos Ernesto Camet, who pursued a political career. Carlos, who served as a deputy to the national congress, was, like the rest of his family, supportive of the Radical Civil Union, an Argentine political reform party formed in the 1890s.

Although trained as a lawyer, Carmelo began fencing at an early age, beginning in the 1910s, at the behest of his father and, much like his father, specialized in épée, while also being proficient at fleuret. In 1918 he came in first place in the former category and second in the latter at a competition, organized by the city of Buenos Aires. In the next two years, he finished at the top in both events and became nationally known. In 1921 the Argentine Fencing Federation was founded and, in 1922, the organization sent him to represent Argentina in the Olimpiados Latinamericanos, a celebration overseen by the International Olympic Committee to celebrate the centenary of Brazil's declaration of independence. His native country won first place in the épée, fleuret and sabre events in the host city of Rio de Janeiro. At the age of 17, he was one of the youngest competitors to represent his country at these games.

== Olympic career ==
The Argentine Fencing Committee had great difficulty in organizing a team to attend the 1924 Summer Olympics. Despite the establishment of the Argentine Olympic Committee, and his participation and success in all of the trials, Camet did not attend a congratulatory gala for the Olympic delegation, nor did he travel to Paris to participate in the games themselves, for personal reasons. The official report lists him as a member of the official delegation, albeit one who did not participate. That year, the Argentines placed fifth in the team foil competition. He continued to practice fencing until 1926 when, after winning a national championship, he put the sport on hold to complete his law degree.

Camet did, however, travel to Amsterdam to participate in the 1928 Summer Olympics. He was joined by four teammates: Roberto Larraz and Luis Lucchetti, who were part of the 1924 delegation that had placed in fifth place, and newcomers Raul Anganuzzi and Héctor Lucchetti. The fencing competition took place from July 29 to August 11. Camet, who was a substitute, sat out of the matches against Norway and Spain, before being called to replace Héctor Lucchetti against Belgium. After entering the quarter-finals, the team defeated the United States and the Netherlands, advancing undefeated to the quarter-finals, where they bested Hungary. The Argentine team then lost against Italy and France, the eventual gold and silver medal-winning teams respectively. The competition for the bronze medal, which would have been between Belgium and Argentina, was scrapped because the latter had already defeated the former.

Camet, therefore, won the bronze medal in the team foil category, along with his teammates, despite what he considered to be adverse rulings from the jurors. This was the first and, at the time of Camet's death, only Olympic medal for Argentina in fencing. It was also the only bronze medal won by the Argentine delegation in Amsterdam, although silver medals were won by Raúl Landini, Víctor Peralta and the football team, along with gold medals from Víctor Avendaño, Arturo Rodríguez and Alberto Zorrilla.

== Later life ==
After the Olympics, Camet traveled to Navarreux in France to visit his old family home, where his father had studied both academics and fencing. While the victory at Amsterdam was considered a milestone in Argentine athletics at the time, Camet, as a substitute was often forgotten as a contributor by his contemporaries in the fencing community such as Oscar Viñas and Eugenio Peni, despite being a legitimate and official medal winner. He was always given credit by his teammates, however, even if they emphasized his position as a substitute on the team. Camet's father died on July 15, 1931, a few years after Carmelo's success at the Olympics. Carmelo subsequently married Elsie Muir and, in 1981, returned to Navarreux for a second visit. He lived the rest of his life in Buenos Aires. At the time of his death, on July 22, 2007, at the age of 102, he was believed to be the world's oldest living Olympic athlete, although that distinction actually belonged to Erna Sondheim.
