= Edward Barnett =

Edward Barnett may refer to:

- Edward Barnett (cricketer) (1818–1899), English cricketer
- Edward Charles Barnett (1854–1922), Australian businessman and politician
- Edward Willis Barnett (1899–1987), American Olympic fencer and photographer
- Edward William Barnett (1835–1895), British politician
