= Greece at the 1928 Summer Olympics =

- IOC code: GRE
- NOC: Committee of the Olympic Games

in Amsterdam Netherlands
- Competitors: 23 in 4 sports
- Flag bearer: Antonios Karyofyllis
- Medals: Gold 0 Silver 0 Bronze 0 Total 0

Summer Olympics appearances (overview)
- 1896; 1900; 1904; 1908; 1912; 1920; 1924; 1928; 1932; 1936; 1948; 1952; 1956; 1960; 1964; 1968; 1972; 1976; 1980; 1984; 1988; 1992; 1996; 2000; 2004; 2008; 2012; 2016; 2020; 2024; 2028

Other related appearances
- 1906 Intercalated Games

Greece competed at the 1928 Summer Olympics in Amsterdam, Netherlands. Greek athletes have competed in every Summer Olympic Games. 23 competitors, all men, took part in 26 events in 4 sports.

== Boxing ==
Men's Flyweight (– 50.8 kg)

- Nikolaos Felix

- First Round — Defeated José Turra Riviera (CHL), points
- Second Round — Lost to Alfredo Gaona (MEX), points

== Fencing ==
Five fencers, all men, represented Greece in 1928.

Men's foil

- Konstantinos Botasis
- Konstantinos Nikolopoulos

Men's épée

- Tryfon Triantafyllakos
- Konstantinos Bembis
- Georgios Ambet (Note: otherwise Georgios Ampet)

Men's team épée

- Konstantinos Botasis, Tryfon Triantafyllakos, Konstantinos Nikolopoulos, Georgios Ambet, Konstantinos Bembis

Men's team sabre

- Konstantinos Botasis, Georgios Ambet, Tryfon Triantafyllakos, Konstantinos Nikolopoulos
