= Pedro Mercado =

Pedro Mercado may refer to:

- Pedro Mercado (fencer)
- Pedro Mercado (equestrian)
