= János Hajdú =

János Hajdú may refer to:

- János Hajdú (fencer), Hungarian fencer
- János Hajdú (footballer), Hungarian footballer and coach
- Janos Hajdu (biophysicist), Swedish/Hungarian biophysicist
