= Alfred Guth =

Austrian modern pentathlete

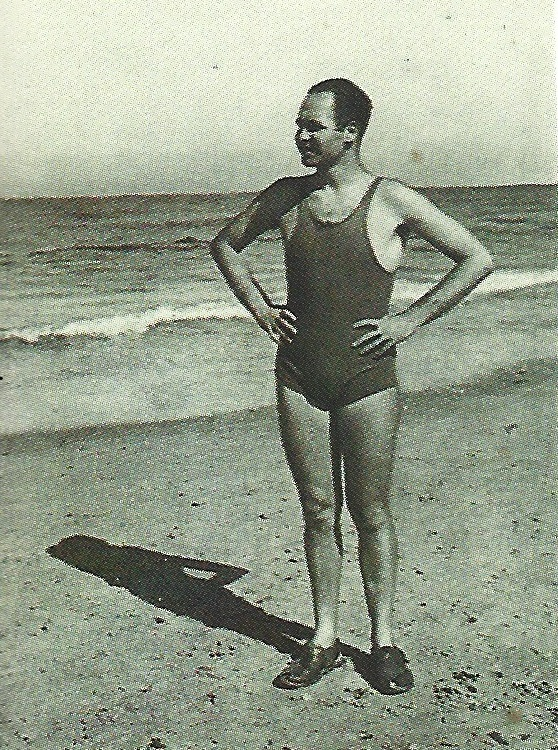
- Alfred Guth in 1934

Personal information
- Born: 27 July 1908 Vienna, Austria
- Died: 13 November 1996 (aged 88) Los Angeles, California, United States

Sport
- Sport: Modern pentathlon, swimming
- Club: Hakoah, Vienna
Medal record
Men's swimming
Representing Austria
Maccabiah Games
Gold medal – first place	1932 Mandatory Palestine	1,500m freestyle
Silver medal – second place	1932 Mandatory Palestine	400m freestyle
Silver medal – second place	1932 Mandatory Palestine	4x200m freestyle

Alfred Guth (27 July 1908 – 13 November 1996) was an Austrian water polo player, swimmer, and modern pentathlete. At the 1932 Maccabiah Games in Mandatory Palestine, in swimming he won a gold medal and two silver medals. He competed at the 1936 Summer Olympics, coming in 33rd in modern pentathlon. A Holocaust survivor, he emigrated to the United States after WWII, competed in Masters swimming, and established 41 U.S. Masters Swimming age-group records.

== Biography ==
=== Austria ===
In 1924 and 1925, swimming for the Jewish sports club Hakoah Vienna, Guth won the Quer Durch Wien (“Across Vienna”) 7.5 km race in the Danube.

Guth competed for Austria at the 1927 Men's Water Polo European Championship in Bologna, Italy, in which the team came in 6th.

Guth competed in swimming at the 1932 Maccabiah Games in Mandatory Palestine. He won a gold medal in the 1,500m freestyle, a silver medal in the 400m freestyle, and a silver medal as part of Team Austria in the 4 × 200 m freestyle.

He competed at the 1936 Summer Olympics, coming in 33rd in modern pentathlon. Guth placed highest in swimming, where he came in 5th, ahead of all three medalists.

=== United States ===
Guth was a Holocaust survivor, and emigrated to the United States.

In the US, Guth lived in San Pedro, California, and competed in Masters swimming. He established 28 individual and 13 relay U.S. Masters Swimming age-group records between 1972 and 1987. He was a Masters All American in 1974 and 1977 (65–69), 1978–79 and 1981-83 (70–74), 1983-87 (75–79), and 1988-89 (80–84).
