= 1932 Maccabiah Games =

Multi-sport event in Mandatory Palestine

1st Maccabiah
- Nations: 27
- Athletes: 390
- Opening city: Tel Aviv, Mandatory Palestine
- Opening: March 28, 1932
- Closing: April 2, 1932
- Opened by: Meir Dizengoff
- Main venue: Maccabiah Stadium

Summer

Winter

The 1st Maccabiah (aka The Maccabiah and the White Horse Olympics) (Hebrew: המכביה הראשונה or Hebrew: המכביאדה) was the first edition of the Maccabiah, which was held in Mandatory Palestine from March 28 to April 2, 1932. The games were in commemoration of the 1800th anniversary of the Bar Kokhba revolt, a major rebellion by the Jews of Judaea Province against the Roman Empire. Despite many obstacles and setbacks, the first Maccabiah was regarded as a great success. Poland led the scoreboard, the United States was second, and Austria was third.

== History ==
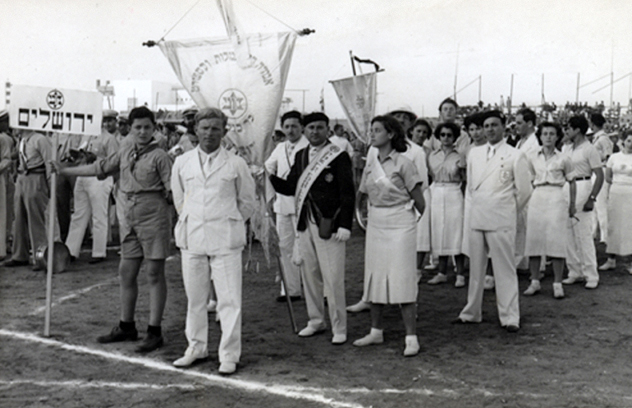
Jerusalem's delegation to the 1st Maccabiah.

The 1st Maccabiah was the result of almost two decades of attempt by Yosef Yekutieli to allow Jews in Eretz Yisrael to participate in international athletic competitions. It wasn't until the Maccabi World Congress in 1929 that his proposal was accepted. The games officially opened on March 28, 1932.

Due to severe lack of funds, the construction of the Maccabiah Stadium did not start until a few weeks prior to the opening ceremony. The land of the stadium was allocated by the British Government which loaned it to Maccabi. The stadium was completed on the night before the opening ceremony.

In the days leading to the opening ceremony, Tel Aviv faced a large shortage of hotel rooms; the residents of Tel Aviv were asked to host guests in their own homes following one of the following recommendation: full accommodations, bed & breakfast, or bed only. Hosts also helped out by taking their guests to their events. 1,000s flowed to the Maccabiah: many via cars, bikes, and on foot. Many of the spectators came wearing white suits and blue hats - as one of the largest Zionist events in history. A large ball was held in Beit Ha'Am on Ben Yehuda Street in Tel Aviv.

== Opening ceremony ==
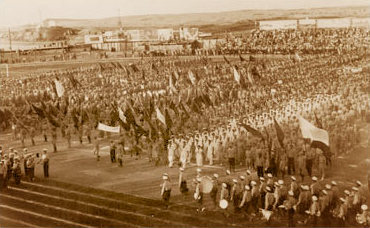
Opening ceremony

The first Maccabiah was attended by 390 athletes from 27 countries. The municipality of Tel Aviv decorated the streets with greenery and flowers. The city was coated with blue and white banners of the Maccabiah. The parade started off with the participants at the Herzliya Gymnasium marching toward the stadium north of the city. At the stadium, they were greeted by the High Commissioner Sir Arthur Grenfell Wauchope, who approved the games. The parade was led by a convoy of horse riders, including Avraham Shapira. Among those riders was Tel Aviv's mayor, Meir Dizengoff, who rode on a distinct white horse. 20,000 spectators were at the opening ceremony. The Maccabiah later became known as the White Horse Olympics.

Following the parade of nations, a large display of athletics took place with over 2,500 athletes taking part. A release of 120 white pigeons was made to honor the Twelve Tribes of Israel.

== Notable competitors ==
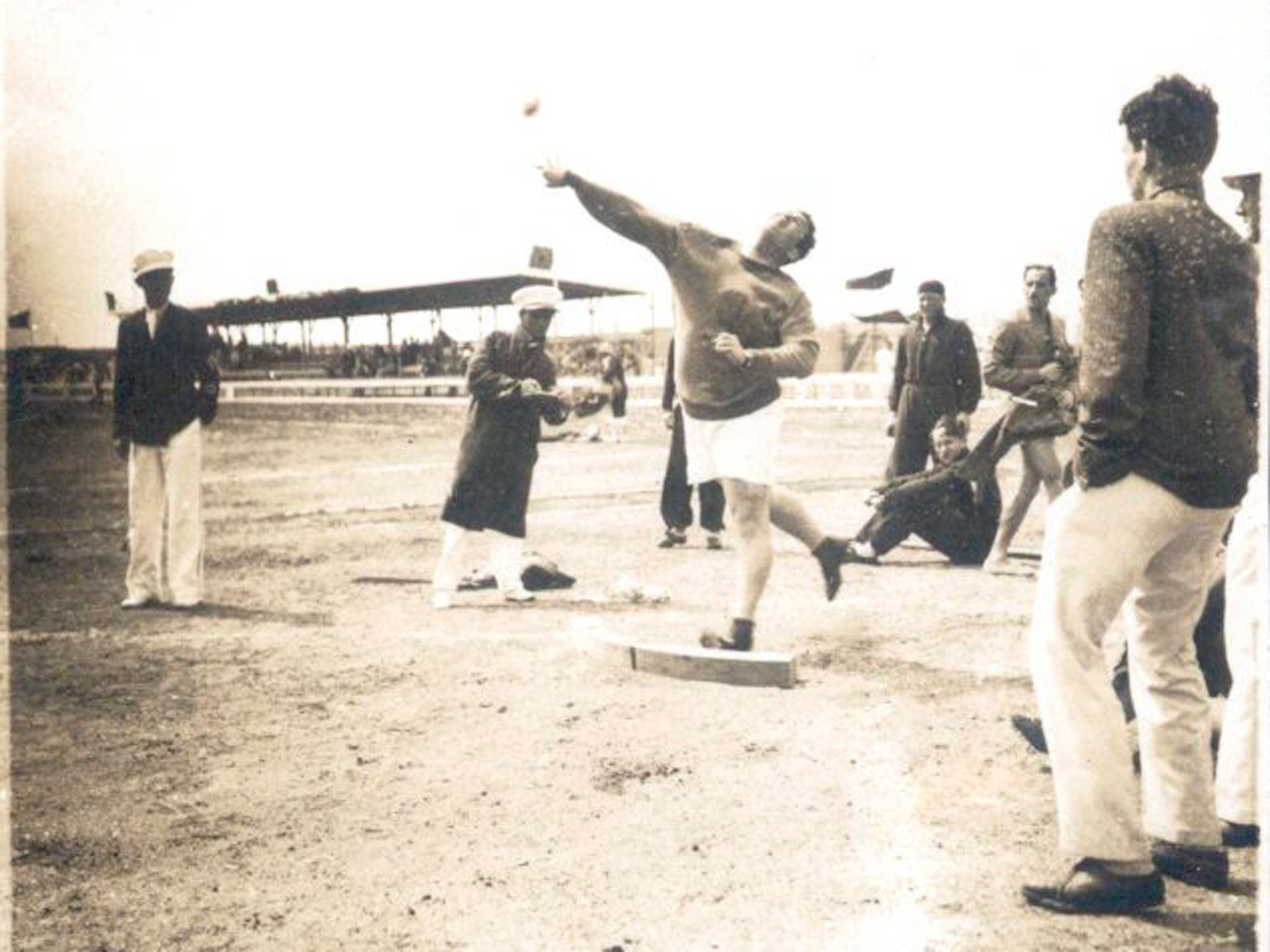
A shot putter in action during the 1st Maccabiah

In wrestling, Olympic silver medalist Abraham Kurland of Denmark won a gold medal in the lightweight category. Olympic bronze medalist Nickolaus Hirschl of Austria won a gold medal in Greco-Roman wrestling in the heavyweight category.

In swimming, Olympian Pavol Steiner of Czechoslovakia competed, and won three gold medals. He won the 100m freestyle (breaking the record from Czechoslovakia), the 3x100m medley relay, and the 4x200m medley relay. Swimmer and future Olympic water polo player Alfred Guth from Austria won a gold medal in the 1,500m freestyle, a silver medal in the 400m freestyle, and a silver medal as part of Team Austria in the 4x200m freestyle, and broke an Austrian record. Olympic swimmer Fritzi Löwy of Austria won gold medals in the women's 100m freestyle and 300m freestyle, and a silver medal in the 200m breaststroke. Austrian Olympic swimmer Hedy Bienenfeld won gold medals in the 100m backstroke, 200m breaststroke, and 4x100 m freestyle, a silver medal in the 100m freestyle, and the bronze medal in the 300m freestyle.

Egyptian Olympic fencer Saul Moyal won gold medals in all three weapons. German Olympic fencer Theodor Fischer won a silver medal in men's foil, and a bronze medal in épée.

Ladislav Hecht of Czechoslovakia, who ranked as high as #6 in the world in tennis, won the gold medal in singles in tennis.

The United States won 12 gold medals in track & field, four alone won by Harry Schneider, a former New York University football and track player, breaking the previous Olympic record in discus throw. In all three events he beat Dave Adelman, former Georgetown University athlete, who took three second places.

== Sports ==
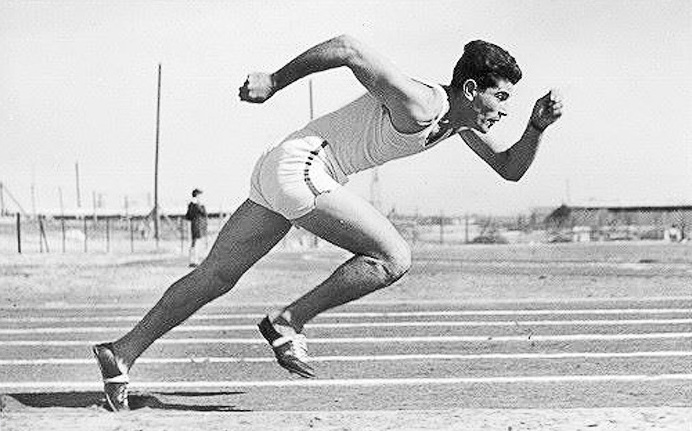
A sprinter at the 1st Maccabiah

Events in the first Maccabiah included:

- Athletics
- Gymnastics
- Swimming
- Football
- Volleyball
- Wrestling
- Track and Field
  - Discus throw
  - Shot put
  - Javelin throw
  - High jump
  - Long jump
- Cycling
- Fencing
- Triathlon
- Water Polo
- Handball

The first Maccabiah hosted a large number of competitions despite the large of venues and equipments. In 1932 Tel Aviv still did not have any swimming pools; the swimming competitions and the water polo games at took place in the Port of Haifa in improvised lanes. Spectators watched the swimming competitions from floating rafts on the water. There was no serviceable gymnastic hall; competitions were held on a wooden platform in Rina Garden located on Shalom Aleichem Street in Tel Aviv. The 5,000 and 10,000 meter races took place on the streets of Tel Aviv - a race that took place on mostly unpaved and sandy roads.

== Participating communities ==
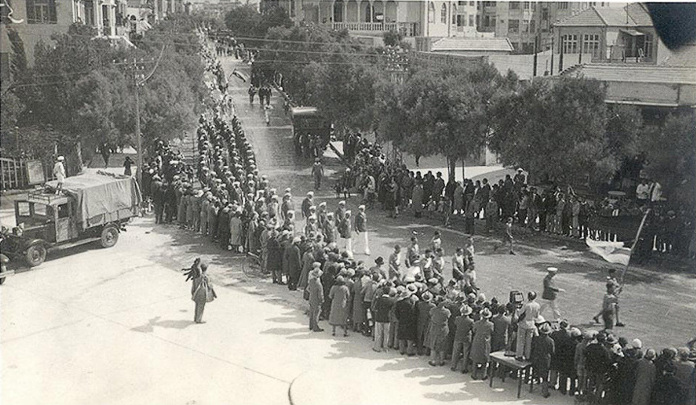
The parade in Tel Aviv during the 1st Maccabiah

390 athletes from 27 countries participated (not all participated in the games), including over 69 Jewish athletes from Arab countries such as Syria, Lebanon and Egypt - including number of Muslim boxers from Egypt participated. A number of individual athletes from "B'nai B'rith" also participated (representing no specific country). Also participating were official British soldiers and policemen. In the first two Maccabiot, only official members of Maccabi were allowed to participate.

The number in parentheses indicates the number of athletes from that delegation.

- Austria
- Australia
- Bulgaria
- Belgium
- Canada
- Czechoslovakia
- Danzig
- Denmark
- Estonia
- Egypt
- Eretz Yisrael
- France
- Germany
- Greece
- Hungary
- Latvia
- Lebanon
- Lithuania
- Netherlands
- Poland
- Romania
- Syria
- Switzerland
- Tunisia
- United Kingdom
- United States (15)
- Yugoslavia

== Medal count ==
Medal count by country
Rank	Country	Points
1	Poland	368
2	United States	285
3	Austria	254
4	Eretz Yisrael	222
5	Czechoslovakia	210
6	Egypt	122
7	Germany	120
8	Denmark	44
9	Great Britain	20
10	Romania	14
11	Yugoslavia	9
12	Syria	6
13	Greece	5
