= Otto Schöpp =

Romanian hurdler

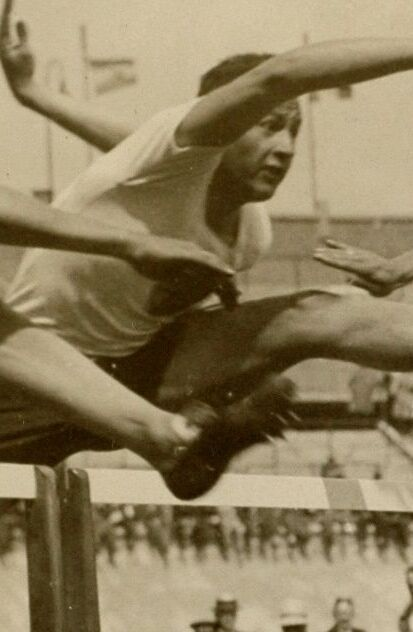
- Otto Schöpp in 1928

Personal information
- Nationality: Romanian
- Born: 4 June 1907 Sebeș, Austria-Hungary
- Died: 29 January 1973 (aged 65) Sibiu, Romania

Sport
- Sport: Track and field
- Event: 110 metres hurdles

Otto Schöpp (4 June 1907 – 29 January 1973) was a Romanian hurdler. He competed in the men's 110 metres hurdles at the 1928 Summer Olympics.
