= Raymond Flacher =

French fencer (1903–1969)

Personal information
- Born: 24 October 1903 Paris, France
- Died: 4 September 1969 (aged 65)

Sport
- Sport: Fencing
Medal record
Men's fencing
Representing France
Olympic Games
Silver medal – second place	1928 Amsterdam	Foil, team

Raymond Flacher (24 October 1903 – 4 September 1969) was a French fencer. He won a silver medal in the team foil event at the 1928 Summer Olympics.
