= Luis da Costa Ivens Ferraz =

Portuguese equestrian

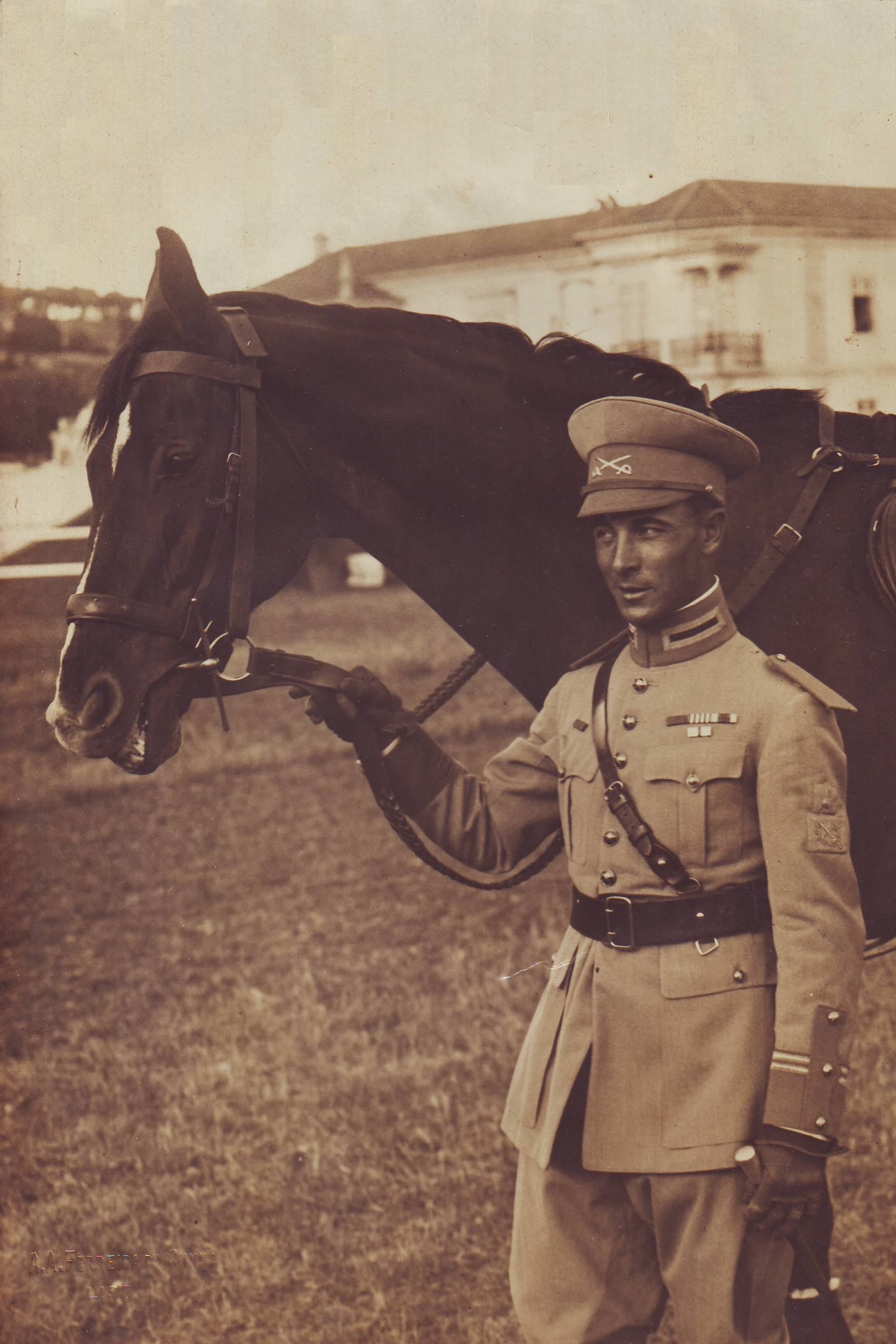
Luís Ivens Ferraz with Marco Visconti, winner of the Grand Prix of Lisbon in 1927

Luís da Costa Ivens Ferraz (15 July 1897 – 1 October 1987) was a Portuguese equestrian and cavalry officer. He competed in the 1928 Summer Olympics.

== Early life ==
Born in Lisbon, he was the son of General Ricardo Júlio Ivens Ferraz and Ana Calhamar da Costa. He was educated at Colégio Militar between 1908 and 1914. He served in the Portuguese Expeditionary Corps in France in 1918 and later joined the School of Cavalry, completing his training in 1922.

== Equestrian career ==
Ivens Ferraz began to compete in show jumping events in 1917, winning his first Grand Prix in 1922. He was a member of the Portuguese equestrian team between 1925 and 1934, competing abroad in Nice, Madrid, Rome, Naples, Milan, San Sebastian and Barcelona. He won the Grand Prix of Lisbon three times, in 1926 riding Roussi and in 1927 and 1930 riding Marco Visconti, becoming the first three-time winner of the main jumping competition held in Portugal. He won in Madrid the Copa SM el Rey in 1928 riding Marco Visconti, a trophy that was handed to him by King Alfonso XIII and which until then had only been won by Spanish riders. He also won the Grand Prix of Madrid in 1930. In the 1928 Summer Olympics he and his horse Marco Visconti finished sixth as part of the Portuguese show jumping team and 15th in the individual jumping competition.

== Military career ==
During the Spanish Civil War, Ivens Ferraz was involved in the Portuguese Military Observation Mission in Spain between May 1937 and June 1938, having taken part in operations in Brunete, Belchite and Teruel. He served in several military units, most notably as commander of the 2nd Lancers Regiment between 1948 and 1953.
