= José de Lima (athlete) =

Portuguese sprinter

Personal information
- Nationality: Portuguese
- Born: 9 July 1907

Sport
- Sport: Sprinting
- Event: 100 metres

José de Lima (born 9 July 1907, date of death unknown) was a Portuguese sprinter. He competed in the men's 100 metres at the 1928 Summer Olympics.
