= Cyril Simey =

British fencer

Personal information
- Full name: Cyril Stillingfleet Aylmer Simey
- Born: 18 September 1905
- Died: 19 September 1952 (aged 47)

Sport
- Sport: Fencing

Cyril Stillingfleet Aylmer Simey (18 September 1905 – 19 September 1952) was a British fencer. He competed in the team foil event at the 1928 Summer Olympics.
