= Émile Cornic =

French fencer (1894–1964)

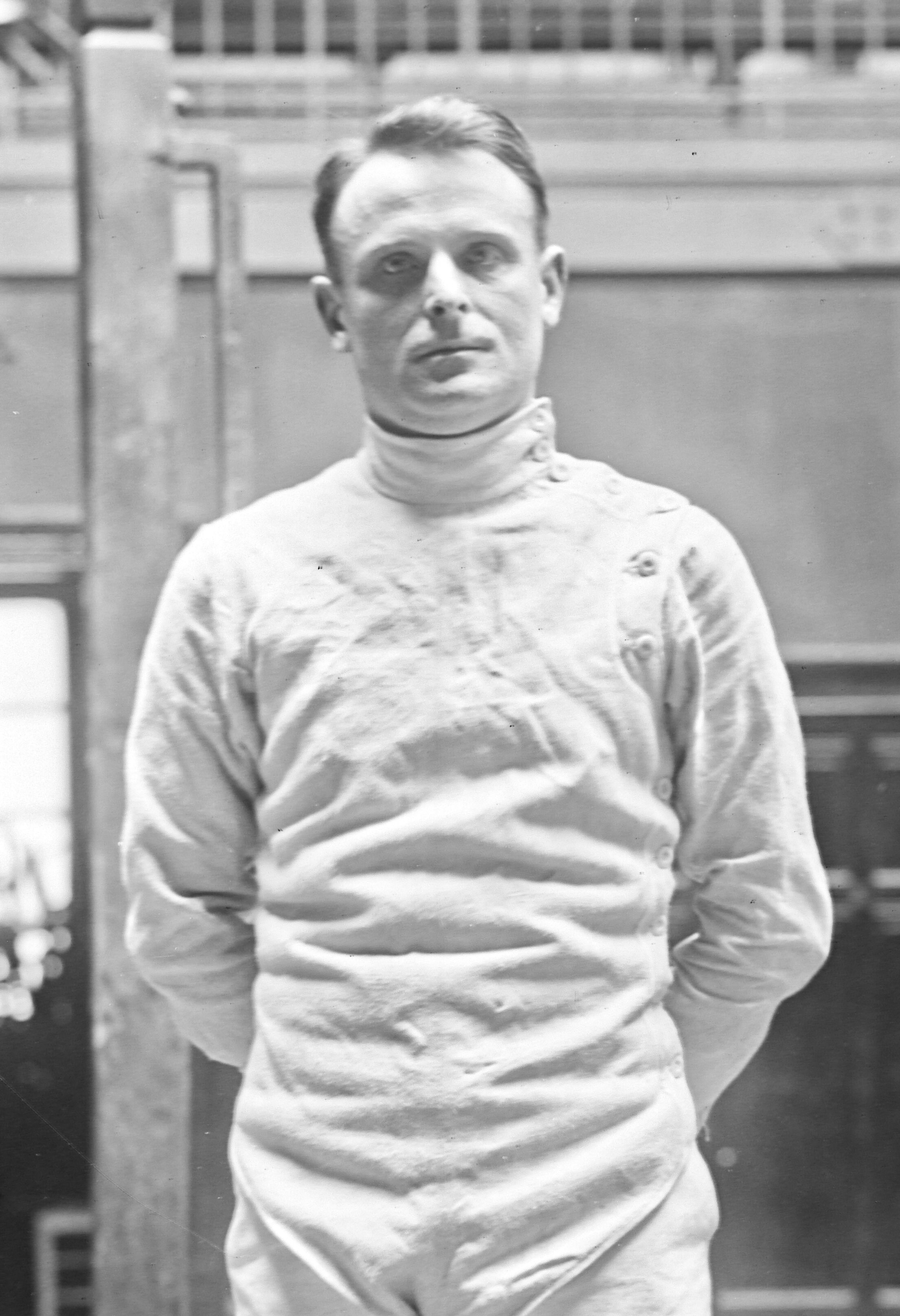

Personal information
- Born: 23 December 1894 Sucy-en-Brie, France
- Died: 20 August 1964 (aged 69)

Sport
- Sport: Fencing
Medal record
Men's fencing
Representing France
Olympic Games
Silver medal – second place	1928 Amsterdam	Épée, team

Émile Cornic (23 December 1894 – 20 August 1964) was a French fencer. He won a silver medal in the team épée event at the 1928 Summer Olympics.
