= René Barbier =

French fencer (1891–1966)

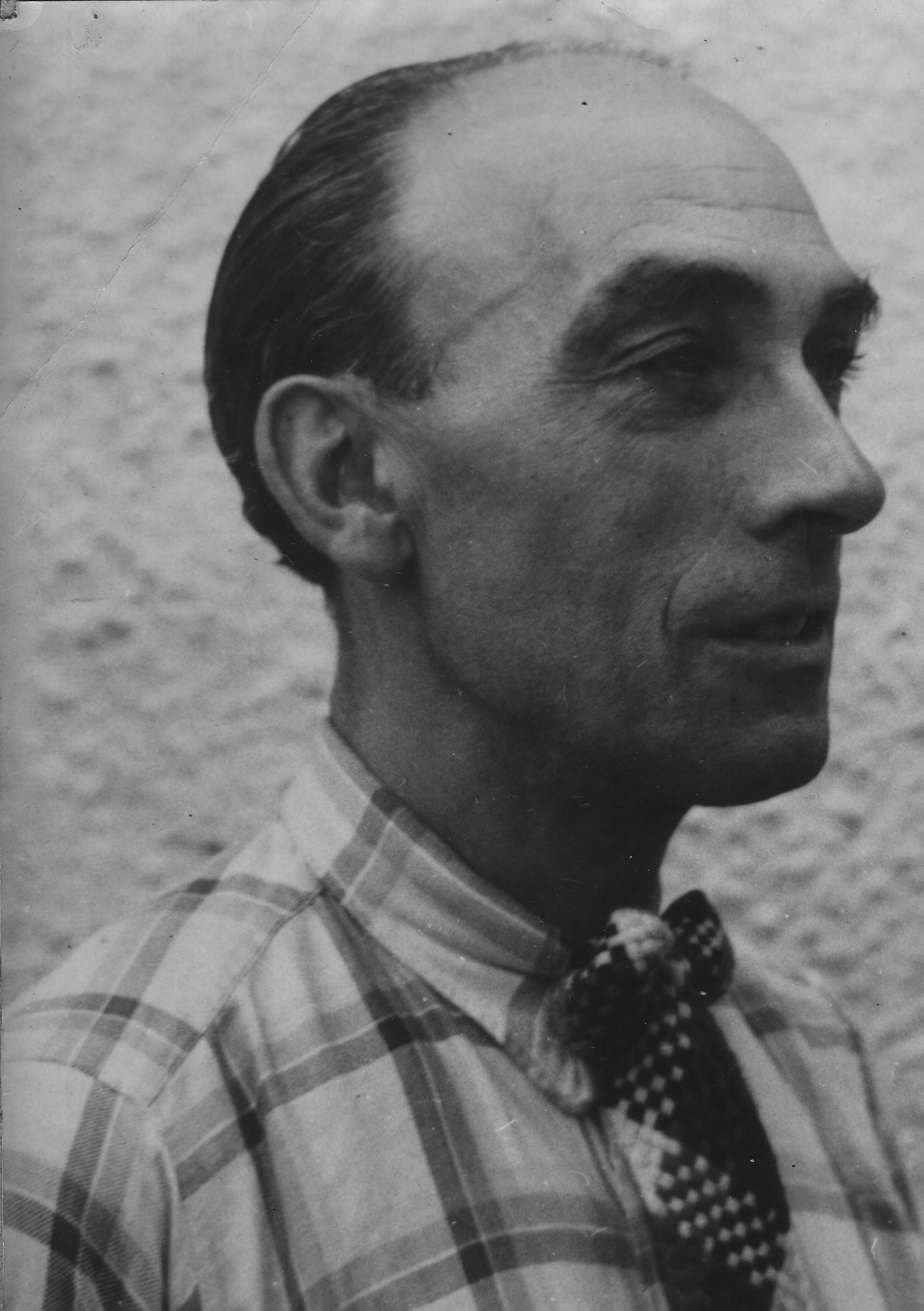

Personal information
- Born: 4 March 1891 Lyon, France
- Died: 14 February 1966 (aged 74) Pully, Switzerland

Sport
- Sport: Fencing
Medal record
Men's fencing
Representing France
Olympic Games
Silver medal – second place	1928 Amsterdam	Épée, team

René Barbier (4 March 1891 – 14 February 1966) was a French fencer. He won a silver medal in the team épée event at the 1928 Summer Olympics.
