= Georges Buchard =

French fencer (1893–1987)

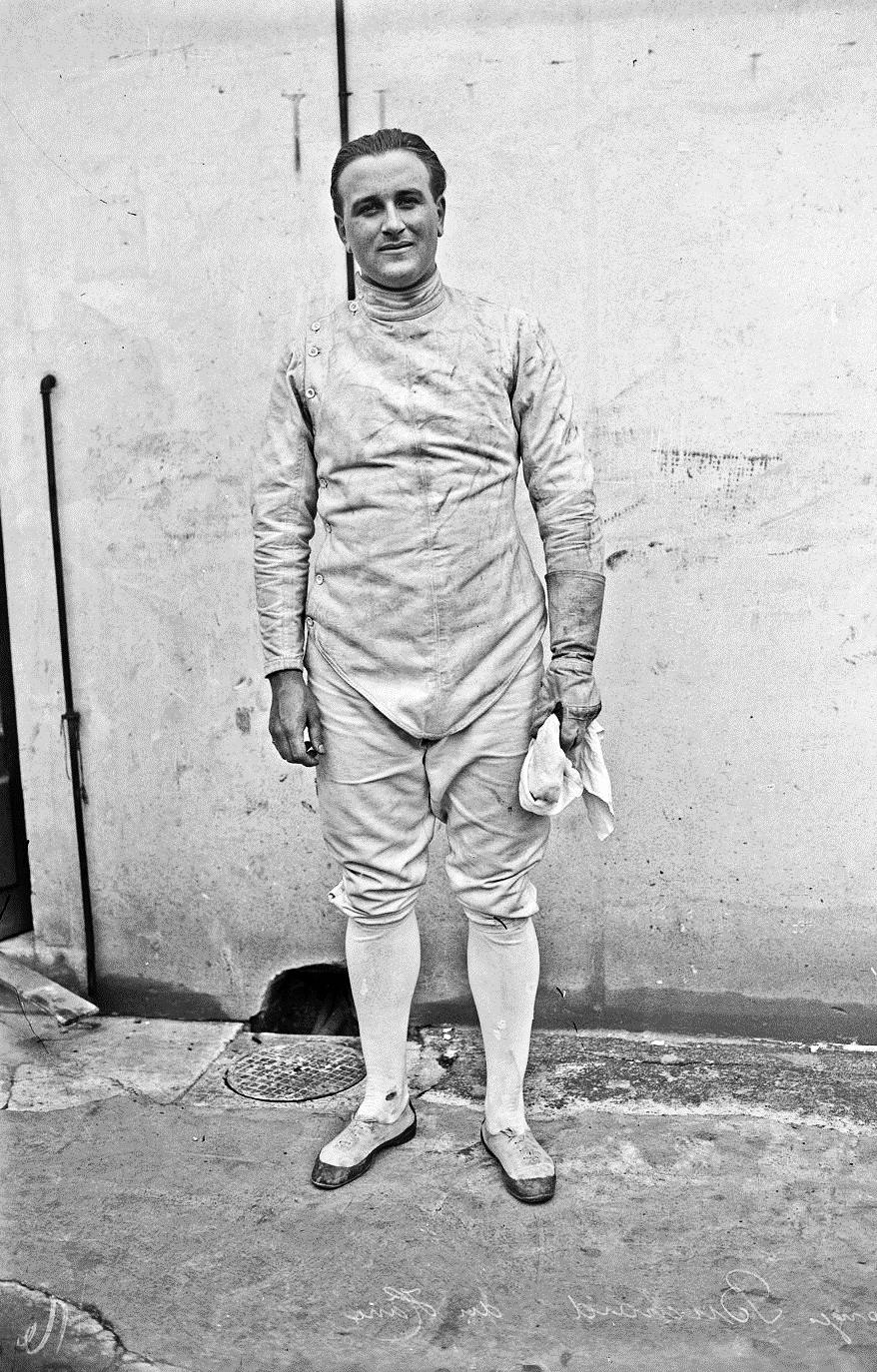
- Georges Buchard in 1922

Personal information
- Born: 21 December 1893 Harfleur, Seine-Maritime, France
- Died: 22 January 1987 (aged 93)

Sport
- Sport: Fencing
Medal record
Men's fencing
Representing France
Olympic Games
Gold medal – first place	1924 Paris	Team épée
Gold medal – first place	1932 Los Angeles	Team épée
Silver medal – second place	1928 Amsterdam	Individual épée
Silver medal – second place	1928 Amsterdam	Team épée
Silver medal – second place	1932 Los Angeles	Individual épée
Bronze medal – third place	1936 Berlin	Team épée

Georges Buchard (21 December 1893 – 22 January 1987) was a French fencer. He won medals in the épée competition at four Olympic Games.
