= Giorgio Pessina =

Italian fencer (1902–1977)

Personal information
- Born: 16 June 1902 Rome, Italy
- Died: 18 July 1977 (aged 75) Rome, Italy

Sport
- Sport: Fencing
Medal record
Men's fencing
Representing Italy
Olympic Games
Gold medal – first place	1928 Amsterdam	Foil, team
Silver medal – second place	1932 Los Angeles	Foil, team

Giorgio Pessina (16 June 1902 – 18 July 1977) was an Italian fencer. He won a gold medal at the 1928 Summer Olympics and a silver at the 1932 Summer Olympics.
