= Jean de Bardel =

Swiss fencer

Alexandre de Dardel
Personal information
- Born: James Alexandre David de Dardel; 8 November 1885 Neuchâtel, Switzerland
- Died: 30 July 1935 (aged 49) Geneva, Switzerland

Sport
- Sport: Fencing

Alexandre de Dardel (8 November 1885 – 30 July 1935) was a Swiss fencer. He competed in the team foil event at the 1928 and 1936 Summer Olympics.
