= José Llauro =

Argentine fencer

Personal information
- Full name: José Salvador Felipe Llauró Serra
- Born: 22 October 1888 Buenos Aires, Argentina
- Died: 28 July 1976 (aged 87) Buenos Aires, Argentina

Sport
- Sport: Fencing

José Llauro (22 October 1888 – 28 July 1976) was an Argentine fencer. He competed in the individual épée event at the 1928 Summer Olympics.
