= Giorgio Chiavacci =

Italian fencer

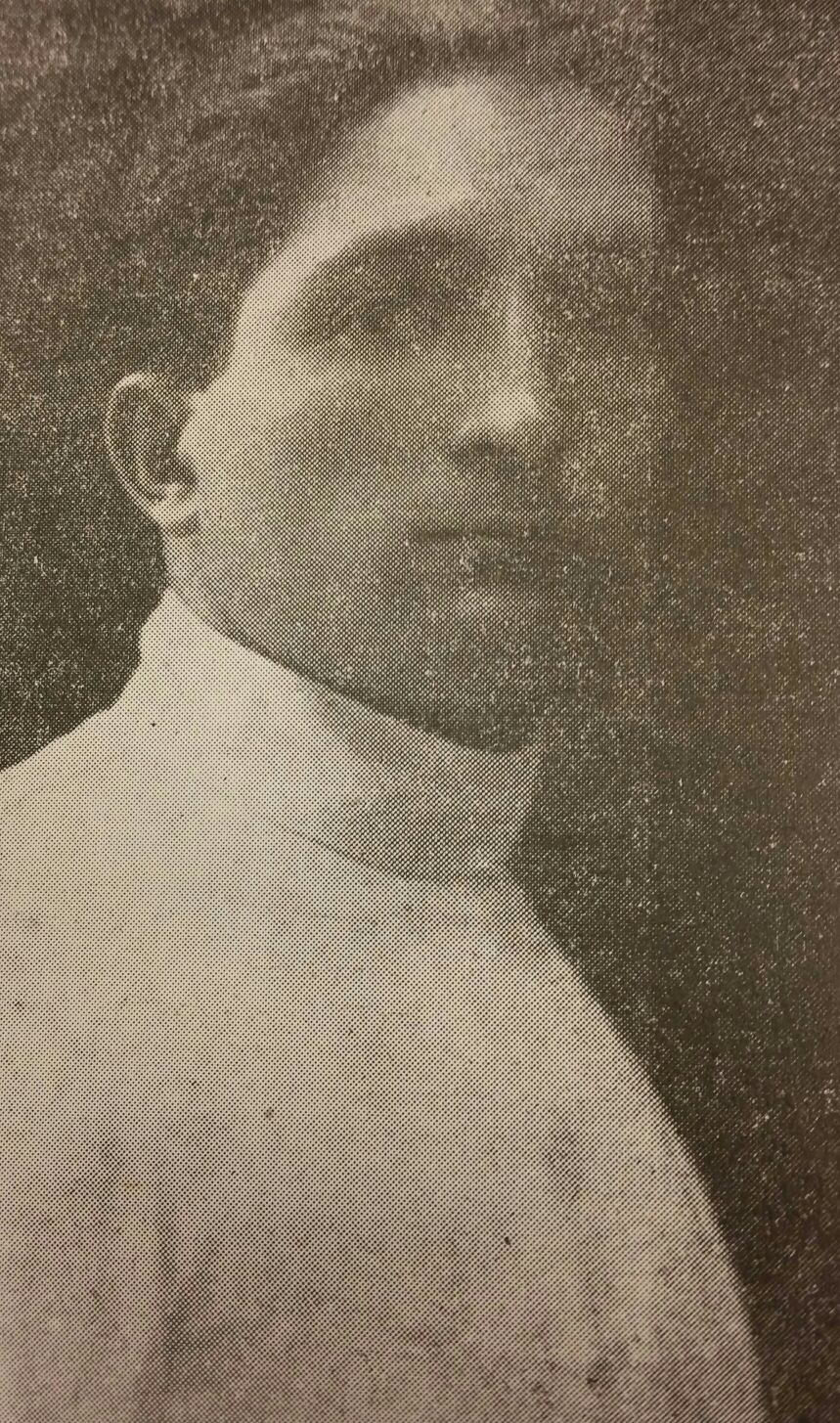

Personal information
- Born: 3 July 1899 Cecina, Italy
- Died: 4 March 1969 (aged 69) Cecina, Italy

Sport
- Sport: Fencing
Medal record
Men's fencing
Representing Italy
Olympic Games
Gold medal – first place	1928 Amsterdam	Foil, team

Giorgio Chiavacci (3 July 1899 – 4 March 1969) was an Italian fencer. He won a gold medal in the team foil competition at the 1928 Summer Olympics.
