= Torvald Appelroth =

Finnish fencer (1902–1984)

Personal information
- Born: 28 July 1902; Porvoo, Finland
- Died: 12 March 1984 (aged 81); Helsinki, Finland

Sport
- Sport: Fencing

Torvald Appelroth (28 July 1902 – 12 March 1984) was a Finnish fencer. He competed in the individual foil and épée events at the 1928 Summer Olympics.
