= Pieter Mijer =

Dutch fencer (1881–1963)

Personal information
- Born: 12 April 1881 Schiedam, Netherlands
- Died: 10 March 1963 (aged 81) New York City, United States

Sport
- Sport: Fencing

Pieter Mijer (12 April 1881 – 10 March 1963) was a Dutch fencer. He competed in the individual épée event at the 1928 Summer Olympics.
