= Oreste Puliti =

Italian fencer (1891–1958)

Personal information
- Born: 18 February 1891 Livorno, Italy
- Died: 5 February 1958 (aged 66) Lucca, Italy

Sport
- Sport: Fencing
Medal record
Men's fencing
Representing Italy
Olympic Games
Gold medal – first place	1920 Antwerp	Foil, team
Gold medal – first place	1920 Antwerp	Sabre, team
Gold medal – first place	1924 Paris	Sabre, team
Gold medal – first place	1928 Amsterdam	Foil, team
Silver medal – second place	1928 Amsterdam	Sabre, team

Oreste Puliti (18 February 1891 – 5 February 1958) was an Italian fencer. He won four gold medals and a silver at three Olympic Games.

His teammates were accused of attempting to inflate his score by losing to him in the final of the Men's Sabre in 1924. He was disqualified for threatening to assault a Hungarian judge, Gyorgy Kovacs.
