= André Gaboriaud =

French fencer (1895–1969)

Personal information
- Born: 1 May 1895
- Died: 23 November 1969 (aged 74)

Sport
- Sport: Fencing
Medal record
Men's fencing
Representing France
Olympic Games
Silver medal – second place	1928 Amsterdam	Foil, team

André Gaboriaud (1 May 1895 – 23 November 1969) was a French fencer. He won a silver medal in the team foil event at the 1928 Summer Olympics.
