= Ion David =

Romanian athletics competitor

Personal information
- Nationality: Romanian
- Born: 1900

Sport
- Sport: Athletics
- Events: Shot put Discus

Ion David (born 1900, date of death unknown) was a Romanian athlete. He competed in the men's shot put and the men's discus throw at the 1928 Summer Olympics.
