= Sebastião Herédia =

Portuguese modern pentathlete

Sebastião de Herédia
Personal information
- Full name: Sebastião de Freitas Branco de Herédia
- Born: 20 March 1903 Mercês, Lisbon, Portugal
- Died: 2 February 1983 (aged 79) Carcavelos, Portugal

Sport
- Sport: modern pentathlon

Sebastião de Herédia (20 March 1903 – 2 February 1983) was a Portuguese modern pentathlete. He competed at the 1928 and 1932 Summer Olympics.

He is the maternal great-grandfather of Afonso, Prince of Beira.
