= Luis Hernández (fencer) =

Mexican fencer

Personal information
- Born: 1907

Sport
- Sport: Fencing

Luis Hernández (born 1907, date of death unknown) was a Mexican fencer. He competed in the individual épée event at the 1928 Summer Olympics.
