= Ladislau Peter =

Romanian sprinter

Personal information
- Nationality: Romanian
- Born: 1899
- Died: July 1995 (aged 95–96)

Sport
- Sport: Sprinting
- Event: 100 metres

Ladislau Peter (1899 – July 1995) was a Romanian sprinter. He competed in the men's 100 metres at the 1928 Summer Olympics.

He died in July 1995 at the age of 96.
