= Edward Barnett (cricketer) =

English cricketer

Personal information
- Full name: Edward Barnett
- Born: 19 November 1818
- Died: 1899 (aged 80–81); Blean, Kent, England

Domestic team information
- Years: Team
- 1841: Sussex

Career statistics
Competition	First-class
Matches	5
Runs scored	42
Batting average	4.20
100s/50s	0/0
Top score	9
Catches/stumpings	6/–
- Source: Cricinfo, 30 June 2012

Edward Barnett (19 November 1818 – 1899) was an English cricketer. His batting and bowling styles are unknown.

Barnett made his first-class debut in 1837, playing for The Bs against the Marylebone Cricket Club (MCC) at Lord's.

In 1841, he appeared in four more first-class matches: three for Sussex—against MCC at Lord's, against Kent at the Old County Ground, West Malling, and again against MCC at the Royal New Ground, Brighton—and one for the Slow Bowlers against the Fast Bowlers at Lord's. His selection for the Slow Bowlers side suggests he was likely a slow bowler, though no definitive record of his bowling style exists. It is also possible that he was included as a given man.

Across his five first-class appearances, Barnett scored 42 runs at an average of 4.20, with a top score of 9. He also took six catches.

Barnett died in Blean, Kent in 1899.
