= Oscar Martínez (fencer) =

Argentine fencer (1889–??)

Personal information
- Born: 1889
- Died: Unknown

Sport
- Sport: Fencing

Oscar Martínez (born 1889, date of death unknown) was an Argentine fencer. He competed in the individual épée event at the 1928 Summer Olympics.
