= Pedro Mercado (fencer) =

Mexican fencer

Sport
- Sport: Fencing

Pedro Mercado was a Mexican fencer. He competed in the individual épée event at the 1928 Summer Olympics. Mercado is deceased.
