= Hans Halberstadt =

German fencer (1885–1966)

Personal information
- Nationality: German-born American
- Born: Hans Ignaz Halberstadt; 10 June 1885 Offenbach am Main, Germany
- Died: 22 September 1966 (aged 81) San Francisco, California, United States

Sport
- Country: Germany; USA
- Sport: Fencing
- Event(s): Epee and sabre

Hans Ignaz Halberstadt (10 June 1885 – 22 September 1966) was a German-born American Olympic épée and saber fencer.

== Early and personal life ==
Halberstadt was born and raised in Offenbach am Main, Germany, and was Jewish. He was trained at the Offenbach am Main Fechtclub.

== Fencing career ==
Halberstadt was German National Champion in epee in 1922 and 1930. He was also German team sabre champion with Fechtclub Offenbach in 1924 and 1925.

He competed for Germany in the individual and team épée and team sabre (coming in fourth) events at the 1928 Summer Olympics in Amsterdam at the age of 42.

After the Nazis came to power, after Kristallnacht his family's business was seized by the Nazis and Halberstadt was interned in Bergen-Belsen concentration camp by the Nazis because he was Jewish. He then fled Germany at the age of 56 with what he could carry, first to London, and then San Francisco in 1940.

Halberstadt then became 1940 US Sabre Champion, both in individual saber and team saber.

In San Francisco he taught fencing in the 1940s at the San Francisco Olympic Club and then at his own club which he opened, and ran a fencing supply company. Among his students in San Francisco were Helene Mayer and Tommy Angell. His name lives on through a San Francisco fencing club founded by his students after his 1966 death.

Halberstadt was inducted into the U.S. Fencing Hall of Fame, in its Class of 2013.

== See also ==
- List of USFA Hall of Fame members
