= Saul Moyal =

Egyptian fencer

Personal information
- Born: شاوؤل مويال

Sport
- Country: Egypt
- Sport: Fencing
- Event(s): Foil, epee, and sabre
Medal record
Maccabiah Games
| Gold medal – first place | 1932 Palestine | Men's foil |
| Gold medal – first place | 1932 Palestine | Epee |
| Gold medal – first place | 1932 Palestine | Sabre |

Saul Moyal (شاوؤل مويال) was an Egyptian Olympic fencer.

Moyal competed in the individual foil (where he made it to the semi-finals), individual épée (where he came in 10th), the team foil event (where the team was eliminated in the first round), and the team épée event (where the team made it to the quarterfinals) at the 1928 Summer Olympics.

Moyal was Jewish, and at the 1932 Maccabiah Games in Israel, he won gold medals in all three weapons. He was runner-up in the Egyptian foil championship in 1928, and took third place in 1936.

Moyal is deceased.
