= Fidel González =

Spanish fencer

Personal information
- Born: 24 April 1899

Sport
- Sport: Fencing

Fidel González (born 24 April 1899, date of death unknown) was a Spanish épée and sabre fencer. He competed in three events at the 1928 Summer Olympics.
