= Schermzaal =

Sports venue in Amsterdam, Netherlands

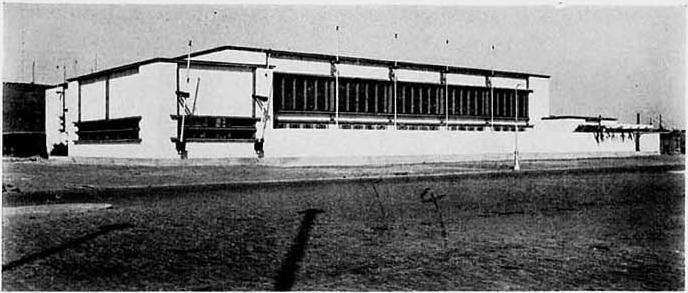
Fencing Hall for the 9th Olympiad, Amsterdam

The Schermzaal (Dutch pronunciation: [ˈsxɛr(ə)mzaːl]; "Fencing Hall") was a sports venue located in Amsterdam, Netherlands. During the 1928 Summer Olympics, it hosted the fencing and the fencing part of the modern pentathlon events.

Designed by architect Jan Wils, the venue contained eight runners, each 2 metres (7 feet) wide by 19 metres (62 feet) long. a wing to the building contained eight dressing rooms, a shower, and an administrative room. It was located next to the Olympic Stadium.

The venue has since been demolished.
