= Héctor Lucchetti =

Argentine fencer

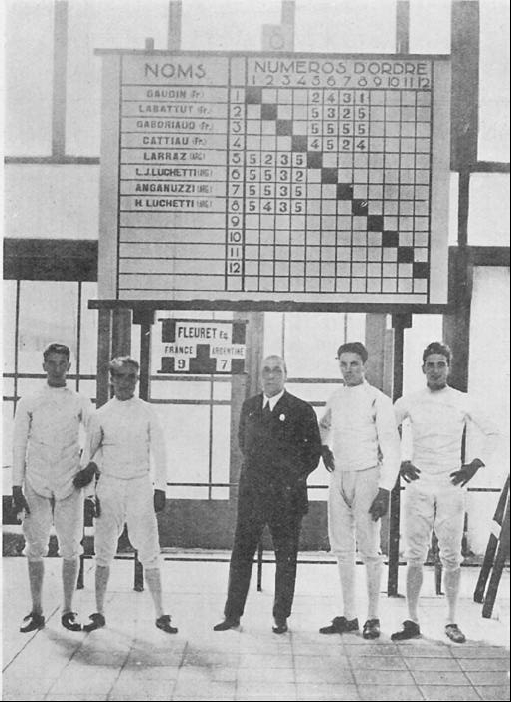

Personal information
- Born: 9 March 1905 La Plata, Argentina

Sport
- Sport: Fencing
Medal record
Men's fencing
Representing Argentina
Olympic Games
Bronze medal – third place	1928 Amsterdam	Foil, team

Héctor Lucchetti (born 9 March 1905, date of death unknown) was an Argentine fencer. He won a bronze medal in the team foil competition at the 1928 Summer Olympics.
