= Willem Driebergen =

Dutch fencer (1892–1965)

Personal information
- Born: 4 June 1892 Katwijk aan Zee, Netherlands
- Died: 7 April 1965 (aged 72) Harmelen, Netherlands

Sport
- Sport: Fencing

Willem Driebergen (4 June 1892 – 7 April 1965) was a Dutch fencer. He competed in the individual and team épée events at the 1928 and 1936 Summer Olympics.
