= Konstantinos Botasis =

Greek fencer

Personal information
- Born: 1890 Athens, Greece
- Died: Unknown

Sport
- Sport: Fencing

Konstantinos Botasis (Greek: Κωνσταντίνος Μπότασης, born 1890, date of death unknown) was a Greek Olympic fencer. He competed at the 1928 and 1936 Summer Olympics.
