= Raúl Anganuzzi =

Argentine fencer

Personal information
- Born: 20 June 1906

Sport
- Sport: Fencing
Medal record
Men's fencing
Representing Argentina
Olympic Games
Bronze medal – third place	1928 Amsterdam	Foil, team

Raúl Anganuzzi (born 20 June 1906, date of death unknown) was an Argentine fencer. He won a bronze medal in the team foil competition at the 1928 Summer Olympics.
