= Luis Lucchetti =

Argentine fencer

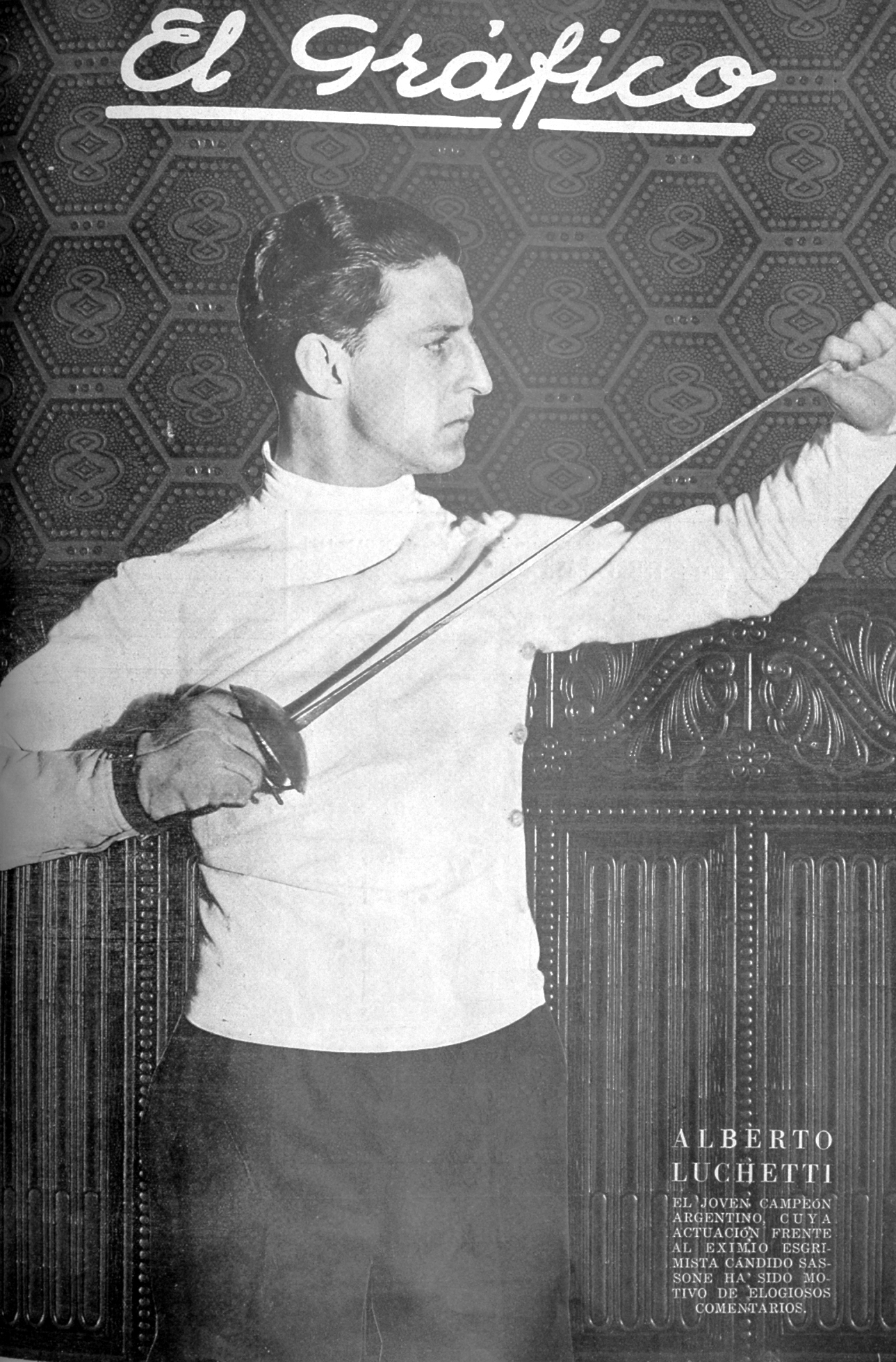

Personal information
- Born: 18 November 1902 La Plata, Argentina
- Died: 6 August 1990 (aged 87) Buenos Aires, Argentina

Sport
- Sport: Fencing
Medal record
Men's fencing
Representing Argentina
Olympic Games
Bronze medal – third place	1928 Amsterdam	Foil, team

Luis Lucchetti (18 November 1902 – 6 August 1990) was an Argentine fencer. He won a bronze medal in the team foil competition at the 1928 Summer Olympics.
