= Fritz Jack =

German fencer

Personal information
- Born: 24 December 1879 Frankfurt, German Empire
- Died: 15 May 1966 (aged 86) Bad Homburg, West Germany

Sport
- Sport: Fencing

Fritz Jack (24 December 1879 – 15 May 1966) was a German fencer. He competed at the 1908, 1912 and 1928 Summer Olympics.
