= Charles Debeur =

Belgian fencer (1906–1981)

Personal information
- Born: Charles Théodore Ghislain Debeur; 24 March 1906 Ixelles, Belgium
- Died: 23 April 1981 (aged 75) Brussels, Belgium

Sport
- Sport: Fencing

Charles Théodore Ghislain Debeur (24 March 1906 – 23 April 1981) was a Belgian fencer who competed at the 1928, 1936 and 1948 Summer Olympics. Debeur died in Brussels on 23 April 1981, at the age of 75.
