= Mário de Noronha =

Portuguese fencer

Personal information
- Full name: Mário de Lopez da Vasa César Alves de Noronha
- Born: 15 January 1885 Lapa, Lisbon, Portugal
- Died: 9 July 1973 (aged 88) São Sebastião da Pedreira, Portugal

Sport
- Sport: Fencing
Medal record
Men's fencing
Representing Portugal
Olympic Games
Bronze medal – third place	1928 Amsterdam	Épée, team

Mário de Noronha (15 January 1885 – 9 July 1973) was a Portuguese fencer. He won a bronze medal in the team épée competition at the 1928 Summer Olympics.
