= Konstantinos Bembis =

Greek fencer

Personal information
- Born: 1903 Athens, Greece

Sport
- Sport: Fencing

Konstantinos Bembis (Greek: Κωνσταντίνος Μπέμπης, born 1903, date of death unknown) was a Greek Olympic fencer. He competed at the 1928, 1936 and 1948 Summer Olympics.
