= Paulo d'Eça Leal =

Portuguese fencer

Personal information
- Born: 15 July 1901 Lisbon, Portugal
- Died: 18 September 1977 (aged 76)

Sport
- Sport: Fencing
Medal record
Men's fencing
Representing Portugal
Olympic Games
Bronze medal – third place	1928 Amsterdam	Épée, team

Paulo d'Eça Leal (15 July 1901 – 18 September 1977) was a Portuguese fencer. He won a bronze medal in the team épée competition at the 1928 Summer Olympics.
