= Tryfon Triantafyllakos =

Greek fencer

Personal information
- Born: 1891 Athens, Greece
- Died: Unknown

Sport
- Sport: Fencing

Tryfon Triantafyllakos (Greek: Τρύφων Τριανταφυλλάκος; born 1891) was a Greek épée and sabre fencer. He competed at four Olympic Games.
