= Ion Rudeanu =

Romanian fencer

Sport
- Sport: Fencing

Ion Rudeanu was a Romanian fencer. He competed in the team foil and épée events at the 1928 Summer Olympics. Rudeanu is deceased.
