= Salvator Cicurel =

Egyptian fencer (1893–1975)

Personal information
- Born: سليلفاتور شيكوريل; 3 March 1893 Smyrna, Ottoman Empire
- Died: 15 February 1975 (aged 81) Miami, Florida, United States

Sport
- Country: Egypt
- Sport: Fencing
- Event(s): Foil and epee
- Club: Maccabi Sports Club

Salvator Cicurel (Arabic: سالفاتور شيكوريل; Hebrew: סלבטור סיקורל; 3 March 1893 – 15 February 1975) was an Egyptian Olympic foil and epee fencer, and later the president of Cairo's Sephardic Jewish Community Council from 1946 until 1957.

== Personal life ==
Cicurel was born in Smyrna, in the Ottoman Empire, and was Jewish. His father was Moreno Cicurel, and he had two brothers, Solomon and Joseph. The family immigrated from Smyrna to Cairo, Egypt in 1870. He was educated in Switzerland.

His father first opened a textile store in Cairo, and then a department store Au Petit Bazaar, which eventually became Les Grand Magasins Cicurel, a grand emporium. After their father died in 1919, the three sons ran the family business. Solomon was stabbed to death at home in his bed in Cairo in March 1927. Following his brothers’ deaths, Salvator led the family business, owning Les Grands Magasins Cicurel & Oreco S.A.E., which was a favorite shopping destination for the Egyptian royal family.

In addition to his prowess in fencing, he was also an elite Egyptian golfer. In 1933, his niece, Solomon Cicurel’s daughter Lili, married Pierre Mendès France who later became Prime Minister of France from 1954-55.

He was a leader of the Cairo Jewish community in the first half of the 20th century. He was President of the Cairo Sephardic Jewish Community Council from 1946-57. In a meeting with the American Jewish Committee in New York in October 1948, he stated his belief about the 1948 Cairo bombings “the recent anti-Jewish outbreaks … [were] connected with the existence of Israel and the defeats of the Egyptian Army there.”

During the 1956 Suez Crisis his store was placed under government control. After the war, Cicurel was forced to sell his interest to Egyptian Muslims, and he emigrated to Paris in 1957.

== Fencing career ==
Cicurel won the Egyptian national épée fencing championship in 1928.

Cicurel was captain of the Egyptian fencing team and competed in the individual (coming in tied for 7th) and team épée and team foil events at the 1928 Summer Olympics in Amsterdam at the age of 35.
