= Henrique da Silveira =

Portuguese fencer

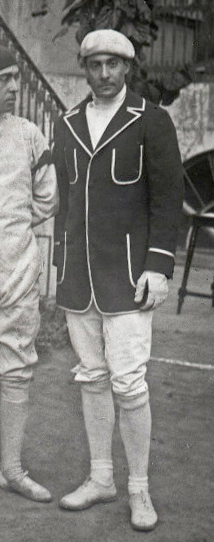
- Henrique da Silveira at the 1928 Olympics

Personal information
- Full name: Henrique Cunha da Silveira
- Born: 26 January 1901 Angra do Heroísmo, Azores
- Died: 9 April 1973 (aged 72) Lisbon, Portugal

Sport
- Sport: Fencing
- Event: Épée
Medal record
Representing Portugal
Olympic Games
| Bronze medal – third place | 1928 Amsterdam | Épée, team |

Henrique de Sampaio e Castro Pereira da Cunha da Silveira (26 January 1901 – 9 April 1973) was a Portuguese épée fencer. He competed at the 1920, 1924, 1928 and 1936 Olympics and won a team bronze medal in 1928. His teams finished fourth in 1920 and 1924, and his best individual result was sixth place in 1936.
