= George Calnan =

US navy officer and fencer

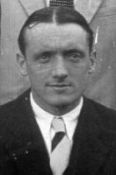
- Born: George Charles Calnan; January 18, 1900; Boston, Massachusetts, US
- Died: April 4, 1933 (aged 33) Off the coast of New Jersey, US
- Cause of death: The crash of USS Akron
- Allegiance: United States
- Branch: United States Navy
- Service years: 1918 – 1933
- Rank: Lieutenant
- Education: United States Naval Academy

George Calnan
Medal record

Men's fencing

Representing the United States

Olympic Games
Bronze medal – third place	1928 Amsterdam	Epee, individual
Bronze medal – third place	1932 Los Angeles	Foil, team
Bronze medal – third place	1932 Los Angeles	Epee, team

George Charles Calnan (January 18, 1900 – April 4, 1933) was a United States Navy officer who also competed for the United States as a fencer. Competing in four Summer Olympics, he earned three bronze medals (Individual épée: 1928, Team foil: 1932, Team épée: 1932)

A native of Boston, Massachusetts, Calnan did not start fencing until he was a student at the United States Naval Academy in Annapolis, Maryland. By the time he was a senior, he was captain of the Navy's fencing team. Two years later, Calnan competed for the United States at the 1924 Summer Olympics in Paris where he finished tied for fifth in the team épée competition. Calnan took the Olympic Oath at the 1932 Summer Olympics in Los Angeles.

Calnan was among the 73 fatalities of the USS Akron crash in 1933. He had a lieutenant's rank at the time of the crash.

He was posthumously inducted in the US Fencing Hall of Fame in 1963, among the first inductees. He is also the namesake of the George C. Calnan Memorial Trophy, which is given to the three-weapon championship team.

== See also ==
- List of USFA Hall of Fame members
