= Bertie Childs =

British fencer

Personal information
- Born: 20 October 1894 Sawston, Cambridgeshire
- Died: 10 October 1960 (aged 65) Greenwich, London

Sport
- Sport: Fencing
- Club: Grosvenor FC

Bertie Childs (20 October 1894 – 10 October 1960) was a British fencer. He competed at the 1928 and 1936 Summer Olympics. In 1929 and 1932, he won the épée title at the British Fencing Championships.
