= János Hajdú (fencer) =

Hungarian fencer

Personal information
- Born: 19 September 1904 Budapest, Hungary
- Died: 12 July 1981 (aged 76) Budapest, Hungary

Sport
- Sport: Fencing

János Hajdú (19 September 1904 – 12 July 1981) was a Hungarian fencer. He competed in the individual and team épée events at the 1928 Summer Olympics.
