= Charles Delporte (fencer) =

Belgian fencer

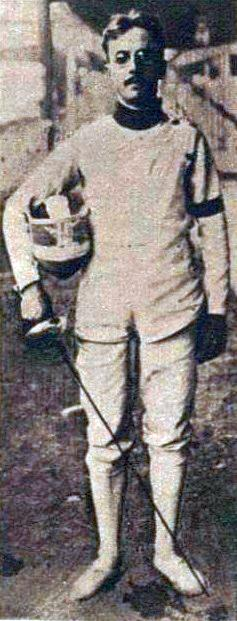
- Delporte in 1924

Medal record

Representing Belgium

Men's Fencing

Olympic Games
Gold medal – first place	1924 Paris	Épée individual
Silver medal – second place	1924 Paris	Épée team

Charles Jules Delporte (11 March 1893 – 9 October 1960) was a Belgian fencer and Olympic champion in épée competition.

He won a gold medal in épée individual at the 1924 Summer Olympics in Paris, and a silver medal with the Belgian team.
