= Răzvan Penescu =

Romanian fencer

Sport
- Sport: Fencing

Răzvan Penescu was a Romanian fencer. He competed in the individual and team épée events at the 1928 Summer Olympics. Penescu is deceased.
