= Elie Adda =

Egyptian fencer

Personal information
- Born: 23 October 1892 Cairo, Egypt
- Died: 11 August 1975 (aged 82) Lausanne, Switzerland

Sport
- Sport: Fencing
- Club: Gezira Sporting Club, Cercle Royal d'Escrime

Elie Adda (23 October 1892 – 11 August 1975) was an Egyptian fencer. He competed in the individual and team épée events at the 1928 Summer Olympics.
