= Edward Willis Barnett =

American fencer (1899–1987)

Personal information
- Born: May 8, 1899 Atlanta, Georgia, United States
- Died: November 8, 1987 (aged 88) Birmingham, Alabama, United States

Sport
- Sport: Fencing

Edward Willis Barnett (May 8, 1899 – November 8, 1987) was an American naval officer, fencer, and art photographer.

Barnett grew up in Birmingham, Alabama and attended the United States Naval Academy at Annapolis, Maryland. He served in France during World War I. He remained in Europe after the war. As an accomplished fencer with the épée, he competed in the 1928 Summer Olympics in Amsterdam for the United States, but won only one match.

Barnett became acquainted with art photographer Man Ray while living in Paris' Montparnasse district. Through him, Barnett joined an artistic circle that included Ford Madox Ford, Gertrude Stein, Guy Pene du Bois and Marcel Duchamp.

Barnett's skills as an art photographer were recognized by the Photographic Society of America and the Federation Internationale d'Art Photographique. His prints have been acquired by the Metropolitan Museum of Art and the Museum of Modern Art in New York City, as well as by the Birmingham Museum of Art in his home state and the Kodak Camera Club's permanent picture collection.

Barnett founded the Alabama Museum of Photography and the Alabama International Exhibition of Photography.
