= Mihai Savu =

Romanian fencer

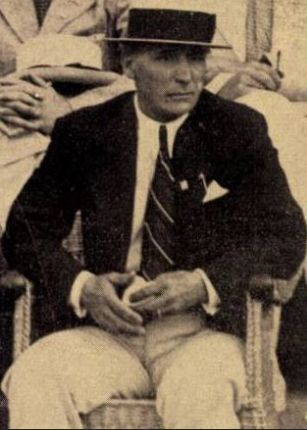

Personal information
- Born: 1894 Bucharest, Romania
- Died: 1968 (aged 73–74)

Sport
- Sport: Fencing

Mihai Savu (1894 – 1968) was a Romanian fencer. He competed in three events at the 1928 Summer Olympics.
