= Édouard Fitting =

Swiss fencer

Personal information
- Born: 15 August 1898 Lausanne, Switzerland
- Died: 7 July 1945 (aged 46)

Sport
- Sport: Fencing

Édouard Fitting (15 August 1898 – 7 July 1945) was a Swiss épée and foil fencer. He competed at four Olympic Games.

His brother, Frédéric Fitting, and sister, Emma Fitting, were also Olympic fencers.
