= Frederico Paredes =

Portuguese fencer

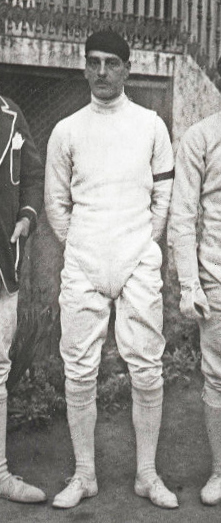
- Paredes at the 1928 Olympics

Personal information
- Born: 31 January 1889 Lisbon, Portugal
- Died: 4 November 1972 (aged 83)

Sport
- Sport: Fencing
- Event: Épée
Medal record
Representing Portugal
Olympic Games
Bronze medal – third place	1928 Amsterdam	Épée, team

Frederico da Cunha Paredes (31 January 1889 – 4 November 1972) was a Portuguese épée fencer. He competed individually and with the team at the 1920, 1924, and 1928 Olympics and won a team bronze medal in 1928; his teams placed fourth in 1920 and 1924.
