= Nicolae Caranfil =

Romanian fencer (1893–1978)

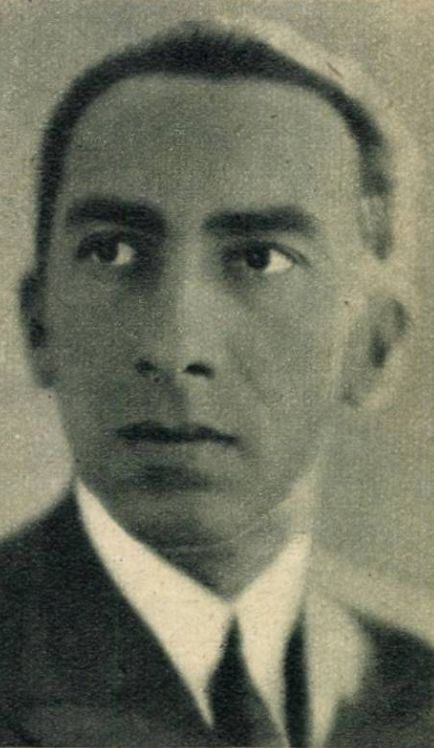

Personal information
- Born: 28 November 1893 Galați, Romania
- Died: 22 April 1978 (aged 84) Forest Hills, New York, United States
- Education: Ghent University

Minister of Air and Marine
- In office 13 November 1936 – 1 January 1937
- Prime Minister: Gheorghe Tătărăscu
- Succeeded by: Gheorghe Tătărăscu

Sport
- Sport: Fencing

Nicolae Gheorghe Caranfil (also spelled Caramfil; 28 November 1893 – 22 April 1978) was a Romanian fencer. He competed in the team foil and épée events at the 1928 Summer Olympics.

Born in Galați, he completed his secondary studies at the city's Vasile Alecsandri High School in 1911. He then went to Bucharest to study at the National School of Bridges and Roads, completing his civil engineering studies at the École de Génie Civil of Université de Gand in Belgium, followed by post-graduate studies at the University of Cambridge.

After returning to Romania, Caranfil was mobilized into the Army in 1916 as a second lieutenant and served in an artillery unit during World War I. From 1922 to 1929 he was director of the Electrica company, founded by fellow engineer Dimitrie Leonida.

From 13 November 1936 to 1 January 1937 Caranfil served as Minister of Air and Marine in the Third Tătărăscu cabinet. He was elected a corresponding member of the Romanian Academy in 1940.

A street in Sector 1 of Bucharest is named after him.
