= Dan Gheorghiu =

Romanian fencer

Sport
- Sport: Fencing

Dan Gheorghiu was a Romanian fencer. He competed in three events at the 1928 Summer Olympics. Gheorghiu is deceased.
