= Joly =

Joly may refer to:

== People ==
- Alexandre Joly (born 1948), French pyrotechnic entrepreneur and politician
- Charles Jasper Joly (1864–1906), Irish mathematician and astronomer
- Cyril Bencraft Joly, soldier and writer
- Dom Joly (born 1967), British television comedian
- Édouard Joly (1898–1982), French aeroplane designer
- Eva Joly (born 1943), Norwegian-born French magistrate and politician
- Greg Joly (born 1954), Canadian ice hockey player
- John Joly (1857–1933), Irish scientist
- Justin Joly (born 2004), American football player
- Maurice Joly (1829–1878), French satirist and lawyer
- Mélanie Joly (born 1979), Canadian lawyer and politician
- Rene Joly (born 1965), Canadian who claimed to be a Martian in Joly v Pelletier (1999)
- Sébastien Joly (born 1979), French road-racing cyclist
- Sylvie Joly (1934–2015), French actress and comedian
- Joly Braga Santos (1924–1988), Portuguese composer and conductor

== Other uses ==
- Joly, Ontario, a township in the Almaguin Highlands region
- Joly (crater), impact crater on Mars
- Grupo Joly, Spanish publishing company

== See also ==
- Jolly (disambiguation)
- Jollie, a surname
- Jollie River, New Zealand
