= Jolley (surname) =

Jolley is a surname, also spelt Jolleys and Jolly.

It may refer to:

== Jolley ==
- Al Jolley (1899–1948), American football player and coach
- Ben Jolley (born 1986), Australian footballer
- Christian Jolley (born 1988), English footballer
- Clark Jolley (born 1970), American politician
- Dan Jolley, American author
- Doug Jolley (born 1979), American football player
- Edward Jolley (1874–1915), Australian politician
- Elizabeth Jolley (1923–2007), Australian writer
- Gordon Jolley (born 1949), American football player
- Gwilt Jolley (1859–1916), English painter
- I. Stanford Jolley (1900–1978), American actor
- James Jolley (1813–1892), Scots Canadian saddler and politician
- Jim Jolley (c. 1876–1928), English rugby league footballer and coach
- John L. Jolley (1840–1926), American politician
- Judy Mohraz née Jolley (born 1943), American CEO, philanthropist, and president of Goucher College
- LeRoy Jolley (1938–2017), American racehorse trainer
- Lewis Jolley (born 1949), American football running back
- Leo Jolley, (1920-1976), English information scientist
- Moody Jolley (1910–1976), American racehorse breeder and trainer
- Michael Jolley (born 1977), English football coach
- Rashida Jolley, American harpist
- Shane Jolley (born 1971), Canadian politician
- Smead Jolley (1902–1991), American baseball player
- Stan Jolley (1926–2012), American art director
- Steve Jolley (born 1975), American soccer player
- Steven Jolley (born 1950), half of Jolley & Swain, a British songwriting duo
- Teddy Jolley (1871–1895), English footballer
- Terry Jolley (born 1959), English footballer
- William Jolley (1923–1995), English cricketer
- William Jolley (architect) (1836–1919), English architect

== Jolly ==
- Alan Jolly (1910–1977), British military officer
- Alexander Jolly (1756–1838), Scottish bishop
- Alison Jolly (1937–2014), American primatologist
- Allison Jolly (born 1956), American sailor
- André Jolly (1799–1883), Belgian engineer, painter, military official, and politician
- Arthur M. Jolly (born 1969), American writer
- Cathy Jolly (born 1972), American politician from Missouri
- Courtney Jolly (born 1986), American monster truck driver
- Darren Jolly (born 1981), Australian footballer
- Dave Jolly (1924–1963), American baseball player
- David Jolly (born 1972), American politician
- E. Grady Jolly (1937–2026), American judge
- Friedrich Jolly (1844–1904), German neurologist and psychiatrist
- George Jolly (1640–1673), English actor, impresario
- Gordon Jolly (1913–1986), New Zealand lawn bowler
- Hayden Jolly (born 1992), Australian footballer
- Hi Jolly (1828–1902), Jordanian camel driver
- Hugh Jolly (1918–1986), British paediatrician
- J. G. Jolly (1926–2013), Indian physician
- John Jolly (c. 1769–1838), American Cherokee native
- Johnny Jolly (born 1983), American footballer
- Julius Jolly (politician) (1823–1891), German politician
- Julius Jolly (Indologist) (1849–1932), German scholar and translator
- June Jolly (1928–2016), British nurse
- Justin Marie Jolly (1870–1953), French hematologist
- Kellie Harper née Jolly (born 1977), American basketball player and coach
- Mike Jolly (born 1958), American football player
- Nicci Jolly (born 1981), Scottish television presenter
- Norman Jolly (1882–1954), Australian cricketer and forestry administrator
- Pete Jolly (1932–2004), American jazz pianist
- Philipp von Jolly (1809–1884), German physicist and mathematician
- Richard Jolly (born 1934), British development economist
- Rick Jolly (1946–2018), British naval medical officer
- Rob Jolly (born 1945), Scots-Australian politician
- Sandy Jolly (born 1954), Canadian businesswoman and politician
- Shaun Jolly (born 1998), American football player
- Stephen Jolly (born 1962), Australian politician, socialist activist, author and construction worker
- Tom Jolly (born 1954), American board game inventor
- Vijay Jolly (born 1960), Indian politician
- Warren Jolly (born 1983), American entrepreneur
- William Jolly (1881–1955), Australian politician

== See also ==
- Jolly family, Belgian noble family
