= Jolly (disambiguation) =

Jolly is a synonym for "Happy".

Jolly or Jolley may also refer to:

== Places ==
=== United States ===
- Jolly, Georgia, an unincorporated community
- Jolley, Iowa, a city
- Jolly, Missouri, an unincorporated community
- Jolly, Texas, a city

=== Elsewhere ===
- Jolly Creek, British Columbia, Canada
- Jouli or Jolly, Uttar Pradesh, India, a village

== People ==
- Jolley (surname), a list of people surnamed Jolley or Jolly
- Jolly Katongole (born 1985), Ugandan boxer
- Jolly Kramer-Johansen (1902–1968), Norwegian composer
- nickname of Mike Carter (born 1955), American-Israeli basketball player
- nickname of Jack Froggatt (1922-1993), English footballer

== Families ==
- Jolly family

== Other uses ==
- Jolly (record company), an Italian company founded in 1958
- Jolly (film), a 1998 Indian Tamil-language film
- Jolly, aka The Incredible Jolly, an American rock group
- Jolly's (department store), English department store
- Fiat Jolly, a beach car variant of the Fiat 600 automobile
- Partenavia Jolly, an Italian two-seat training monoplane
- Jolly, fictional lawyer in the Indian legal comedy film series Jolly LLB

== See also ==
- Jolly Cola, a Danish soft drink
- Jollie, a surname
- Jollie River, New Zealand
- Jolie (disambiguation)
- Joly (disambiguation)
