= List of Belgian noble families =

A list of noble families in Modern Belgium with additions of former houses.

== General ==
Currently, the Belgian crown recognizes (in ascending order) the titles of jonkheer, knight, baron, viscount, count, marquis, duke and prince. The persons who legally are member of the nobility have the legal right to protect their family name and coat of arms.

The houses bearing the titles of prince and duke are described more thoroughly on the Belgian nobility page.

== Princes ==
- d'Arenberg
- de Chimay et de Caraman
- de Croÿ, de Croÿ-Rœulx, de Croÿ-Solre
- de Ligne, de Ligne de la Trémoïlle
- de Lobkowicz
- de Merode
- Swiatopolk-Czetwertynski (Polish princely family whose title was recognized in Belgium in 2007)
- de Béthune Hesdigneul
- de Waterloo (Wellesley family)

== Dukes ==
- Duke of Arenberg (also Duke of Aarschot)
- Duke of Beaufort-Spontin
- Duke of Looz-Corswarem
- Duke of Ursel

== Marquesses ==
- Marquess of Assche (for the head of the van der Noot family)
- Marquess of Beauffort (only for the head of the house; the others are count/countess)
- Marquess of Imperiali des Princes de Francavilla
- Marquess of Parc Locmaria (only for the head of the house; the others are count/countess)
- Marquess of Radiguès Saint-Guédal de Chennevière
- Marquess of Ruffo de Bonneval de La Fare des Comtes de Sinopoli de Calabre
- Marquess of Trazegnies d'Ittre
- Marquess of Westerlo (for the head of the House of Merode, in addition to the title of prince)
- Marquess of Yve (only for the head of the house; the others are count/countess)
- Marquis of Flanders (De Bentz Family)

== Counts ==
- d'Alcantara, d'Alcantara de Querrieu
- de Marchant et d'Ansembourg
- d'Arschot Schoonhoven
- d'Aspremont Lynden (de Maillen)
- de la Barre d'Erquelinnes
- de Beaufort, de Liedekerke Beaufort
- de baillet von latour
- du Bois d'Aische
- de Borchgrave d'Altena (Merghelynck)
- de Bousies (Borluut)
- de Briey
- de Brouchoven de Bergeyck, de Brouchoven de Bergeyck de Namur d'Elzée
- de Broqueville
- van der Burch
- Buysse (created Count Buysse in 2014, hereditary title)
- Carpentier de Changy
- du Chastel de la Howarderie
- Christijn de Ribaucourt
- Coghen
- Cornet d'Elzius, Cornet d'Elzius du Chenoy (de Wal), Cornet de Ways Ruart, d'Espiennes Cornet d'Elzius du Chenoy (de Wal)
- Davignon
- della Faille de Leverghem
- Goblet d'Alviella
- Goethals de Mude de Nieuwland
- Greindl
- le Grelle
- Harmel (created Count Harmel in 1991, hereditary title)
- de Hemptinne (granted in 1886)
- de Jonghe d'Ardoye
- de Kerchove de Denterghem
- t'Kint de Roodenbeke
- de Lalaing
- de Lannoy
- de Launoit
- Lippens (created in 1998)
- de Lichtervelde
- de Liedekerke
- de Limburg Stirum
- de Marnix de Sainte-Aldegonde
- de Meeûs d'Argenteuil, de Meeûs d'Argenteuil de Trannoy
- de Mercy-Argenteau
- de Montpellier de Vedrin
- de Norman et d'Audenhove
- van der Noot
- O'Kelly de Galway (Created in 1720 in what was then the Austrian Low Countries)
- d'Oultremont, d'Oultremont de Wégimont et de Warfusé
- de Patoul
- Nagant De Deuchaînes
- de Pret Roose de Calesberg (head of the family is Count, the others are Écuyer)
- van de Putte
- de Renesse
- de Robiano
- van Rompuy
- Ryckmans (Created in 1962, hereditary title)
- de T'Serclaes de Wommersom
- van der Stegen de Schrieck
- van der Straten-Ponthoz, van der Straten Waillet
- de Traux de Wardin (created count de Traux in 2013, hereditary title, priorly baron)
- d'Udekem d'Acoz
- Veldeman
- Visart de Bury Bocarmé
- van de Werve de Vorselaar

== Viscounts ==
- Auxbrebis
- de Baré de Comogne
- de Beughem de Houtem
- de Biolley
- du Bus de Warnaffe
- Deligne
- de Duve (Christian)
- Eyskens, created Viscount Eyskens, since 1973 (hereditary title)
- Jolly
- de Harlez
- de Jonghe d'Ardoye
- van Leempoel de Nieuwmunster
- Poullet
- Simonis
- de Spoelberch
- Terlinden
- Vilain XIIII
- van de Werve d'Immerseel

== Barons ==
- van den Abeele (non hereditary title)
- Allard
- d'Anethan
- Bastin (non hereditary title)
- de Beco
- de Bethune
- Beyens
- Baeyens
- du Bois de Nevele
- Bonaert
- de Bakker
- de Bernard de Fauconval (de Deukem)
- Bloch
- van Blommestein
- de Bonhome
- de Bonvoisin
- de Borrekens
- van den Branden de Reeth
- de Brouwer
- le Clément de Saint-Marcq
- van der Bruggen
- van Caloen
- de Cartier d'Yves
- Cardon de Lichtbuer
- Casier
- Clerix
- Cogels
- Colruyt
- de Coninck
- Coppens d'Eeckenbrugge
- de Crombrugghe, de Crombrugghe de Picquendaele, de Crombrugghe de Schipsdaele, de Crombrugghe de Looringhe
- Delbeke
- Descantons de Montblanc, de Visch
- Dessain
- Devisch
- Dillemans
- Dumont de Chassart
- Donny
- van Eetvelde
- van der Elst
- Empain
- Evain
- van Eyll
- de Coninck de Merckem
- della Faille d'Huysse
- de Favereau
- Fallon
- de Fierlant (-Dormer)
- Fredericq
- Gendebien
- Gericke d'Herwynen
- de Gerlache de Gomery
- Gilles de Pélichy
- Goethals
- Goffinet
- Gosselin
- Greindl
- Groothaert
- de Groote
- de Gruben
- van Gruyninghen
- Guillaume
- de Haulleville
- de Herckenrode, since 1846
- Herry
- d'Huart
- Holvoet
- Houtart
- van Houtte
- d'Ieteren
- Iweins de Wavrans
- Jacobs
- Jacques de Dixmude
- de Jamblinne de Meux
- Janssen
- Jolly
- Joly
- van der (vander) Kemnade
- de Kerchove
- Kervyn d'Oud Mooreghem, Kervyn de Volkaersbeke, and Kervyn de Lettenhove, Kervyn de Meerendré
- de Keyser
- t' Kint de Roodenbeke
- de La Vallée Poussin. since 1930
- Kronacker
- Lambermont, since 1863
- de Laminne de Bex
- Leclercq
- Lepage
- Lequime
- Liebaert, since 1930
- Lhonneux
- van Loo
- de Loppem
- de Macar
- de Maere d'Aertrycke
- del Marmol
- de Martial de Frandeux
- de Meester de Ravenstein
- Merckx
- Minne
- Minnebo
- Van Moerkerke-Damme; the Flemish-Belgian title belongs to the Marquess van Eeden (Dutch nobility). The title is bestowed on the eldest male heir of the Marquise van Eeden.
- de Moffarts, de Moffarts d'Houchenée
- Mols
- Moncheur
- de Montpellier
- de Moreau
- Moyersoen
- Muijsson
- Nicaise
- Nicolet
- Nothomb
- Orban de Xivry
- d'Otreppe de Bouvette
- de Pélichy
- de Pitteurs Hiegaerts
- Poma
- de Potesta, de Potesta de Waleffe
- Prisse
- Pycke, Pycke de Peteghem and Pycke de Ten Aerde
- de Radzitzky d'Ostrowick
- de Rennette de Villers-Perwin
- Ruzette
- de Sadeleer
- de Schaetzen
- de Sélys Longchamps
- van der Smissen
- Snoy et d'Oppuers
- de Spot
- van der Straten Waillet
- de Streel
- Surlet de Chokier
- Surmont de Courtrécy, Surmont de Volsberghe, Surmont ter Straeten
- Terlinden (also Viscounts)
- Theodore (Baron de Calwaert)
- Tibbaut
- de Tornaco
- de Trannoy
- d'Udekem d'Acoz
- Van Lysebeth
- Vaxelaire
- de Villenfagne de Vogelsanck
- de Viron
- Verhaegen
- Verdickt
- Verwilghen
- de Vinck de Winnezeele
- de Vleeschauwer van Braekel
- Van Voorst tot Voorst
- de Vriere
- Wahis
- van de Werve
- Whettnall
- de Witte
- Woot de Trixhe
- de Wykerslooth de Rooyensteyn
- van Zuylen, van Zuylen de Gaesebeke, van Zuylen van Nyevelt

== Knight ==
Only men can be knights, ladies can be styled the lower rank of Jonkvrouw.

- Cleenewerck de Crayencour
- Clément de Saint-Marcq
- de Crane d'Heysselaer
- Dirix
- vander Eecken
- Fauvage
- le Fevere de Ten Hove
- de Gaesebeke
- de Ghellinck
- Leyniers
- van Havre
- Huyghens
- Kraft de la Saulx, recognised in 1887
- Lannoo
- Beumont Vati
- de Laminne de Bex
- de Mahieu (only the family head)
- de Maurissens
- de Menten de Horne
- du Mortier
- van Outryve d'Ydewalle
- Parthon de Von
- van Praet d’Amerloo
- Raes
- van Tieghem de Ten Berghe
- Rosseeuw
- de Sauvage
- de Schaetzen, de Schaetzen de Schaetzenhoff, de Schaetzen van Brienen
- Eric de Spot
- Speeckaert
- de Theux de Meylandt et Montjardin
- de Wouters d'Oplinter
- Van Hoecke

== Ecuyer (jonkheer/jonkvrouw) ==
- Boël family.
- van Ackere
- Agie de Selsaeten (Agie de Selsaten)
- Anciaux Henry de Faveaux
- André-Dumont
- d'Andrimont
- Anne de Molina
- Annez de Taboada
- Arrazola de Oñate
- Assenmascher
- de Barsy
- de Bauer
- du Bois de Vroylande
- Bauchau
- Beaucarne d'Eenaeme
- Beeckmans de West-Meerbeeck
- de Behault
- du Bois de Nevele, du Bois d'Aische, du Bois de Vroylande
- Berger
- Boucquéau
- de Braconier
- de Bruyn
- de Cambry de Baudimont
- Cardon de Lichtbuer
- Carton de Tournay
- Claeys Boúúaert
- Coart
- de Cock
- de Coune
- Cogels
- Coget
- Coomans de Brachène
- Van Cutsem
- de la Croix d'Ogimont
- Demeure de Lespaul
- Descampe
- van Dievoet
- Duquesne Watelet de la Vinelle
- de Duve
- Ernst de la Graete
- van der Essen
- Van den Eynde
- della Faille de Leverghem
- le Fevere de Ten Hove
- de Francquen
- Geelhand de la Bistrate, Geelhand de Merxem
- de Gheldere
- Gilliot
- van der Gracht
- Guyot de Mishaegen
- de Halleux
- de La Hamayde, de La Hamaide
- van den Hecke de Lembeke
- Hendrickx van den Bosch
- Henkart
- d'Hennezel
- Henry de Frahan
- Hermanns
- de Hollain
- d'Hoop
- d'Hoop de Synghem
- Jacobs
- Jacquet de Haveskercke
- Janssen
- Janssens de Bisthoven
- Jacobs van Merlen
- Jooris
- Joos de ter Beerst
- van der Kelen
- de Keyser
- t'Kint de Roodebeke
- Lannoo
- Lantonnois van Rode
- Leman
- Lepage
- Le Mayeur de Merprès
- Lequime
- Limme van Overloop, Limme d'Altena
- Limpens
- Linard de Guertechin
- Errembault du Maisnil et du Coutre
- van Maldeghem
- de Mahieu (knight for the head, écuyers for the rest of the family)
- Matthieu de Wynendale, since 1957
- Maus de Rolley
- de Meester (de Meester de Ravestein, de Meester de Betzenbroeck, de Meester de Heyndonck)
- van Melckebeke van den Nieuwenhuysen
- Mertens de Wilmars
- Mols
- Monnoyer de Galland de Carnières
- Montens d'Oosterwyck
- Morel de Westgaver
- Moretus Plantin de Bouchout
- Oldenhove de Guertechin
- van de Kerchove
- Nobels
- Nolf
- Peltzer
- Plissart de Brandignies
- de Potter
  - de Potter de Zinzerling
  - de Potter d’Indoye
- Pouppez de Kettenis de Hollaeken
- de Prelle de la Nieppe
- de Roest d'Alkemade Oem de Moesenbroeck
- de Roye van Wichen ( de Roye de Wichen)
- van der Straten-Ponthoz
- Serné
- Scheppers de Bergstein
- van der Schueren Devèze
- de Smet
- de Smet de Naeyer
- de Smet d'Olbecke
- Spruyt
- Speeckaert
- Terlinden (also viscounts and barons)
- Thibaut de Maisières
- de Thomaz de Bossierre
- Timmermans
- d'Udekem d'Acoz
- d'Udekem Gentinnes
- d'Udekem de Guertechin
- Uyttenhove
- van Ackere
- van den Berg
- van der Vaeren
- Van Lysebeth
- van Neste
- van Outryve d'Ydewalle
- van Wassenhove
- de Vaucleroy
- de Walque
- de Wasseige
- van Wassenhove
- de Wautier
- Waucquez
- Watelet
- de Wilde d'Estmael
- de Witte
- Wittouck
- Woronoff
- van Zuylen
