= Corrida de Houilles =

Road running event in Houilles, France

Coordinates: 48.9244°N 2.1875°E

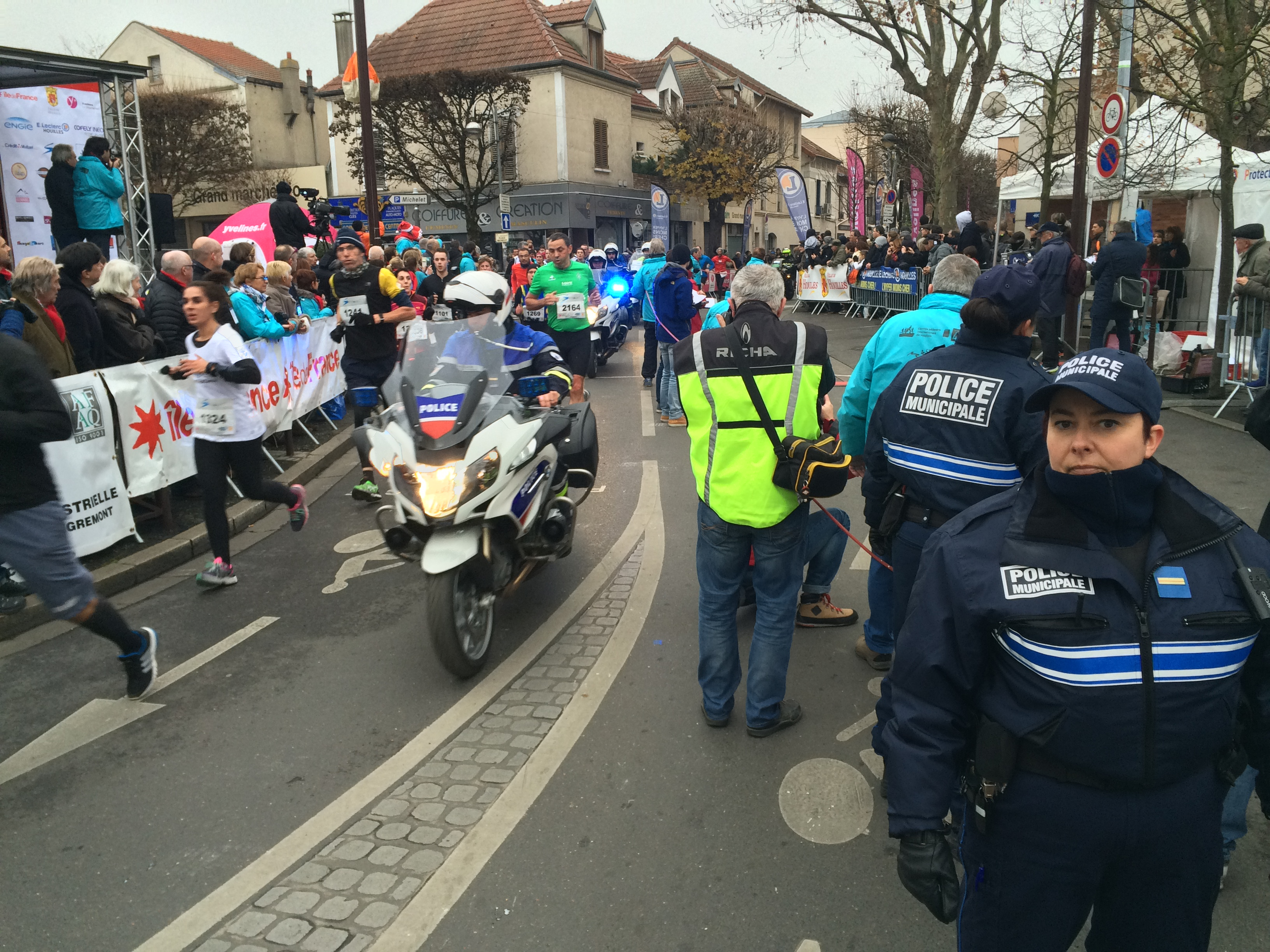
- Corrida Houilles 2016
- Date: late December
- Location: Houilles, France
- Event type: 10K run
- Distance: 10 km
- Established: 1972
- Course records: Men: 27:12 (2019) (Kenya) Daniel Ebenyo; Women: 30:32 (2019) (Kenya) Norah Jeruto
- Website: Corrida de Houilles
- Participants: 2,147 (2019); 2,257 (2018)

The Corrida de Houilles, officially Corrida pédestre internationale de Houilles (Houilles International Footrace), is an annual 10K run that takes place at the end of December in Houilles, France.

The competition was created in 1972 by Alexandre Joly, a French politician who would later become Mayor of Houilles. He was inspired by the Saint Silvester Road Race in São Paulo and decided to set up his own local race in his hometown with the same format – hosting the race on New Year's Eve. Initially a men's event only on a course of around 9 kilometres (5.6 mi), the race attracted high level competition from the beginning, with Poland's Bronisław Malinowski winning the 1974 race the same year as his gold medal win at the 1974 European Athletics Championships. Due to the race's growing popularity, the competition was divided into two segments: an elite-level race and a public race.

Annick Loir was the first known women's winner in 1975, but a separate women's division (over around 6 kilometres (3.7 mi)) was not formally established until 1983. The race distances were set at 10 kilometres (6.2 mi) for both men and women from 1996 onwards, allowing the race to serve as a qualifier for the French 10 km championships. The date of the race has not always been 31 December due to organisational restrictions, but it is usually held within the final days of the year. No race was held in 1999 due to Cyclone Lothar and Martin. The races for 2000 and 2005 were held on New Year's Day instead. The competition gained IAAF Bronze Label Road Race status in 2013 and IAAF Silver Label Road Race status in 2014.

Top level athletes from both France and abroad have competed in Houilles. Jacky Boxberger had much success in the early days of the race, amassing four wins in the late 1970s and early 1980s. Morocco's Khalid Skah had a record eight wins from 1988 to 1997. Ethiopia's Ayelech Worku is the most successful woman at the race, having won four times consecutively from 1995 to 1998. Another Ethiopian woman had three straight wins from 2003 to 2006 Merima Denboba and Kenya's Micah Kogo achieved the same feat on the men's side from 2006 to 2008. The course records are 27:12 minutes for men (set by Daniel Ebenyo in 2019) and 30:32 minutes for women (set by Norah Jeruto in 2019).

== Past winners ==
Key: Course record Around 9 km race Around 6.2 km race

Edition	Year	Men's winner	Time (m:s)	Women's winner	Time (m:s)
1st	1972	Jean-Yves Le Flohic (FRA)	?	Not held	
2nd	1973	Lucien Rault (FRA)	27:16	Not held	
3rd	1974	Bronisław Malinowski (POL)	26:56	Not held	
4th	1975	Jos Hermens (NED)	25:03	Annick Loir (FRA)	?
5th	1976	Markus Ryffel (SUI)	26:07	Not held	
6th	1977	Jacky Boxberger (FRA)	26:18	Not held	
7th	1978	Jacky Boxberger (FRA)	27:38	Not held	
8th	1979	Jacky Boxberger (FRA)	26:55	Not held	
9th	1980	Gerard Deegan (IRL)	26:46	Not held	
10th	1981	Radhouane Bouster (FRA)	26:46	Not held	
11th	1982	Jacky Boxberger (FRA)	26:43	Not held	
12th	1983	Fernando Mamede (POR)	26:32	Francine Peeters (BEL)	20:26
13th	1984	Fernando Mamede (POR)	26:06	Sylvia Kerambrum (GBR)	21:30
14th	1985	Fernando Mamede (POR)	26:12	Ria Van Landeghem (BEL)	20:11
15th	1986	Paul Arpin (FRA)	26:19	Ingrid Delagrange (BEL)	20:55
16th	1987	Paul Arpin (FRA)	26:48	Linda Milo (BEL)	21:02
17th	1988	Khalid Skah (MAR)	26:35	?	?
18th	1989	Khalid Skah (MAR)	26:48	Linda Milo (BEL)	21:27
19th	1990	Khalid Skah (MAR)	26:33	?	?
20th	1991	Khalid Skah (MAR)	26:11	Zohra Koulou (FRA)	20:54
21st	1992	Khalid Skah (MAR)	26:13	Karen Hargrave (GBR)	20:41
22nd	1993	Khalid Skah (MAR)	26:29	Zohra Koulou (FRA)	21:08.0
23rd	1994	Haile Gebrselassie (ETH)	26:38	Elena Fidatov (ROM)	20:08.0
24th	1995	Khalid Skah (MAR)	26:50	Ayelech Worku (ETH)	20:28.0
25th	1996	El Hassan Lahssini (MAR)	28:20	Ayelech Worku (ETH)	33:39
26th	1997	Khalid Skah (MAR)	27:57	Ayelech Worku (ETH)	33:04
27th	1998	Girma Tolla (ETH)	28:12	Ayelech Worku (ETH)	33:29
28th	1999	Cancelled due to Cyclone Lothar and Martin			
29th	2001 (Jan)	Sammy Kipketer (KEN)	28:31	Rakiya Maraoui (FRA)	33:59
30th	2001 (Dec)	Benjamin Limo (KEN)	28:38	Inês Monteiro (POR)	32:41
31st	2002	Sammy Kipketer (KEN)	28:02	Inês Monteiro (POR)	32:42
32nd	2003	Mulugeta Wendimu (ETH)	28:49	Merima Denboba (ETH)	32:43
33rd	2004	Jaouad Gharib (MAR)	28:29	Merima Denboba (ETH)	32:18
34th	2006 (Jan)	Sileshi Sihine (ETH)	28:23	Merima Denboba (ETH)	33:14
35th	2006 (Dec)	Micah Kogo (KEN)	28:16	Nadia Ejjafini (BHR)	32:32
36th	2007	Micah Kogo (KEN)	27:56	Nadia Ejjafini (BHR)	32:10
37th	2008	Micah Kogo (KEN)	28:04	Sylvia Kibet (KEN)	31:50
38th	2009	Joseph Ebuya (KEN)	28:35	Sule Utura (ETH)	32:23
39th	2010	Imane Merga (ETH)	27:47	Sule Utura (ETH)	32:01
40th	2011	Edwin Soi (KEN)	28:17	Margaret Muriuki (KEN)	31:29
41st	2012	Birhanu Legese (ETH)	28:23	Hirut Aga (ETH)	31:50
42nd	2013	Cornelius Kangogo (KEN)	27:58	Afera Godfay (ETH)	32:06
43rd	2014	Victor Chumo (KEN)	28:04	Peres Jepchirchir (KEN)	31:34
44th	2015	Cornelius Kangogo (KEN)	28:10	Zerfie Limeneh (ETH)	32:07
45th	2016	Cornelius Kangogo (KEN)	28:19	Viola Kibiwot (KEN)	31:14
46th	2017	Julien Wanders (SUI)	28:02	Stacy Ndiwa (KEN)	31:35
47th	2018	Julien Wanders (SUI)	27:25	Gete Alemayehu (ETH)	31:12
48th	2019	Daniel Ebenyo (KEN)	27:12	Norah Jeruto (KEN)	30:32
-	2020	Not held due to the COVID-19 pandemic			
-	2021	Not held due to the COVID-19 pandemic			
49th	2022	Telahun Haile Bekele (ETH)	27:29	Mercy Cherono (KEN)	30:55
