= Iron Cross (Belgium) =

1833 award for the Belgian Revolution

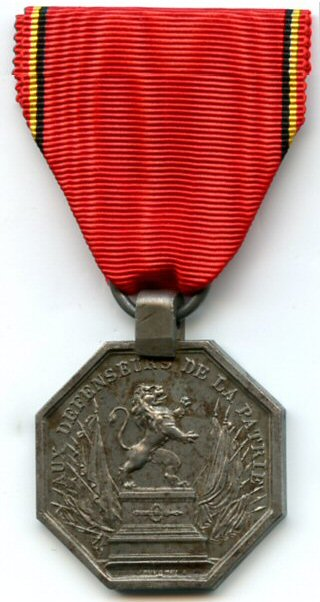
- Iron Cross 2nd class (obverse)
- Type: Combat award
- Awarded for: Wounds received or bravery displayed during combat
- Presented by: Kingdom of Belgium
- Eligibility: Belgian citizens
- Status: No longer awarded
- Established: 8 October 1833

Highlights
- Total: ~1635

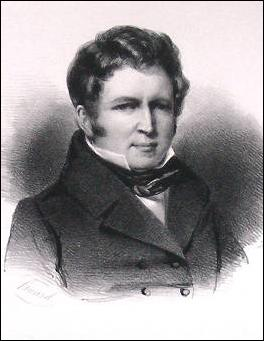
Count Jacques-André Coghen, a recipient of the 1830 Iron Cross

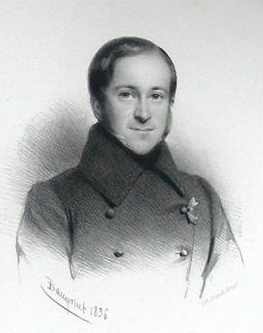
Viscount Charles Vilain XIIII, a recipient of the 1830 Iron Cross

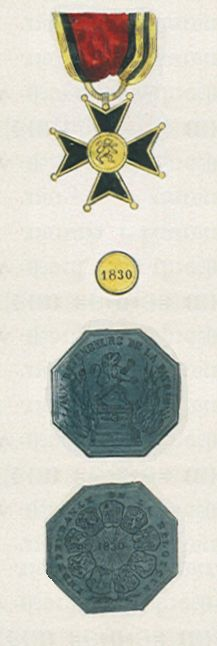
Drawing of the Iron Crosses 1st and 2nd class

The Iron Cross (French: Croix de fer, Dutch: IJzeren Kruis) was established by law in 1833 following the end of the Belgian Revolution to recognise serious wounds received and bravery in battle by Belgian citizens taking part in the fight for Belgian independence from the United Kingdom of the Netherlands between 25 August 1830 and 4 February 1831. A further royal decree of 22 August 1834 created a second class to the Iron Cross for award to all wounded combatants. Due to the lower perceived importance of the second class award and discontent among recipients, the Iron Cross second class was short-lived and amalgamated to the Iron Cross first class by decree of 21 February 1835. All recipients now received the (original) first class award.

== Award statute ==
The Iron Cross (first class) was bestowed to members of the provisional government and to other citizens who were wounded in battle and who elected to stay at their post and keep fighting or who returned to the fight, to the maimed and mutilated, as well as to those who displayed acts of courage in combat and eminent services to the country. Recipients were also honoured with the right to bear arms.

The Iron Cross second class was bestowed to all wounded combatants. All recipients of the Iron Cross 2nd class would receive the 1st class award (original single grade award) in 1835 to replace the by then defunct 2nd class variant.

Over the years, recipients of the Iron Cross received ever increasing pensions, in 1842, those in need or not having any other pension or income would receive 100 francs, this amount was increased to 250 francs in 1855. A law of 27 May 1857 gave civil servants who were recipients of the Iron Cross ten additional years of seniority. A budgetary law enacted in 1858 gave pensions to widows and orphans of deceased recipients of the Iron Cross.

== Award description ==
=== Iron Cross 1st class ===
The Iron Cross first class was a black Maltese Cross struck from iron with a gold central medallion. The cross was outlined in gold and small gilt orbs were affixed to the eight tips of the cross arms. The obverse of the gold central medallion bore the gilt relief image of the Belgian lion, an heraldic "lion rampant", but moving from left to right, surrounded by a golden disc. The reverse bore the gilt relief inscription "1830" also surrounded by a golden disc.

The cross was suspended by a ring through an upper lateral suspension loop from a 31mm wide red silk moiré ribbon with 1.3mm wide yellow edge stripes bordered on the inside by 2.7mm wide black stripes.

=== Iron Cross 2nd class ===
The Iron Cross second class was an octagonal medal struck from iron. Its obverse bore the relief image of the Belgian lion, an heraldic "lion rampant" on a pedestal, but moving from left to right, with banners to the left and right, the relief circular inscription along the medal's upper edge (French: "AUX DEFENSEURS DE LA PATRIE") translating into "TO THE DEFENDERS OF THE COUNTRY". The relief bore the relief coats of arms of the nine Belgian provinces arranged in a circle around a sun with the relief year "1830" superimposed over it, all of which are surrounded by the relief circular inscription (French: "INDEPENDANCE DE LA BELGIQUE") translating into "INDEPENDENCE OF BELGIUM". The award was topped by a pivot mounted crown from which it was suspended to the same ribbon as the cross first class by a ring through a suspension loop.

== Notable recipients (partial list) ==
The individuals listed below were awarded the Iron Cross:

- Lieutenant General Baron André Jolly
- Prime Minister Charles Rogier
- Governor Baron Feuillen de Coppin de Falaën
- Count Félix de Merode
- Civic Guard General Baron Ghislain van der Linden d’Hooghvorst
- Prime Minister Count Félix de Muelenaere
- Count Jacques-André Coghen
- Colonel Charles de Brouckère
- Prime Minister Henri de Brouckère
- State Minister Viscount Charles Vilain XIIII
- State Minister Baron Charles-Augustin Liedts
- State Minister Count Barthelemy de Theux de Meylandt
- Baron Pierre de Schiervel
- State Minister Baron Adolphe de Vrière
- Lieutenant General Baron Pierre Chazal
- Lieutenant General Laurent-Mathieu Brialmont
- State Minister Baron Édouard d’Huart
- Lieutenant General Nicolas Daine
- Civic Guard Honorary Lieutenant General Charles-Joseph Pletinckx

== See also ==
- Orders, decorations, and medals of Belgium
