= José Anne de Molina =

Belgian historian (1925–2020)

Joseph Norbert Leon François Marie Ghislain "José" Anne de Molina (2 September 1925 – 10 May 2020) was a Belgian magistrate, heraldist, and historian.

== Family ==
The Anne de Molina family was first ennobled in 1750, with the ennoblement of the brothers Josephus Adrianus and Carolus Lambertus Anne, both aldermen in the City of Dendermonde. Victor Anne (1819–1891), the latter's grandson, received a recognition of nobility in 1871 and was authorized to add "de Molina" to his last name in 1885.

José Anne de Molina is a grandson of Victor Anne and the son of Raphaël Anne de Molina (1893-1977), president of the Brussels Court of Appeal, and of Germaine, Baroness de Viron (1894–1978). In 1956, he married Marie-Claire de Meeûs (1931-2014), a daughter of Georges, Count de Meeûs d'Argenteuil. They had five children.

== Biography ==
Anne de Molina was born in Brussegem.

After becoming a Doctor of Law, José Anne de Molina went on to build a career in the judicial system, first as a lawyer and later as a magistrate. He started out as a judge at the tribunal of first instance in Brussels, and went on to be a counsellor, president of the chamber and finally first president at the Brussels Court of Appeal. Furthermore, he was a substitute first president at the Military Tribunal.

He was the honorary president of the Office généalogique et héraldique de Belgique ("Genealogical and Heraldic Office of Belgium"). In February 1986, he became a member of the Council of Nobility and was its president from October 1986 until November 1989. In 1960, he co-founded the État présent de la noblesse belge.

He was a Commander in the Order of the Holy Sepulchre.

== Publications ==
- Généalogie de la famille Bassery, in Tablettes du Brabant, Tome I, Hombeek, 1956
- Le dernier roi d'armes Beydaels et sa famille, in: Brabantica, 1959 en 1960
- Le tableau votif de Wauthier V van der Noot, in: Le Parchemin, 1959
- Le château de Nieuwermolen à Capelle Saint Ulric, in: Recueil de l'Office généalogique et héraldique de Belgiquen, T. X
- A propos de quelques usages héraldiques dans les cortèges funèbres aux Pays-Bas, in: Archivum Heraldicum, 1965
- A propos de la Rue du Bois Sauvage. Un drame passionnel entre lignagers bruxellois au XIVe siècle, in: Les lignages de Bruxelles, 1974
- Folklore héraldique. Les funérailles solennelles de Féry de Glymes, baron de Grimberghen en 1571, in: Le Parchemin, 1981
- Odot Viron. Un anoblissement par Charles-Quint, in: Recueil de l'Office généalogique et héraldique de Belgique, 1986.
- Les origines des armoiries du Lignage Steenweegs, in: Les Lignages de Bruxelles, 1987.
- Pierre-Joseph Meeûs, bourgmestre, surnommé l'Homme du gaz, in : Molenbecca ( Cercle d'histoire Locale de Molenbeek-Saint-Jean) n°9, 2003.

== Literature ==
- José ANNE DE MOLINA, Notices biographiques des présidents du Conseil héraldique, in: Chr. HOOGSTOEL-FABRI (dir), Le droit nobiliaire et le Conseil héraldique, Brussel, 1994.
- Oscar COOMANS DE BRACHÈNE, État présent de la noblesse belge, Annuaire 1991, Brussel, 1991.
