= Views on Trial =

1954 British film by Richard Warren

- Frame from the film
- Directed by: Richard Warren
- Screenplay by: Leo Jolley; Dennis Clarke
- Produced by: Ralph May
- Starring: Jimmy Hanley; Robin Bailey; John Glen
- Cinematography: Denny Densham
- Edited by: Bill Freeman
- Production company: Anvil Films
- Release date: 1954
- Running time: 25 minutes
- Country: United Kingdom
- Language: English

Views on Trial (also known as There's Always a Better Way: Views on Trial) is a 1954 British short black and white film directed by Richard Warren and starring Jimmy Hanley, Robin Bailey and John Glen. It was written by Leo Jolley and Dennis Clarke, and produced by Ralph May for the British Productivity Council, a government body that aimed to increase Britain's industrial efficiency, as part of the film series There's Always a Better Way.

== Plot ==
The setting is a courtroom, with the film's audience invited to act as the jury. Nicholas Diabolus is on trial accused of inciting unrest. He dislikes work and change. He fears that the use of automation and machinery to improve productivity will lead to mass unemployment. The court is shown examples of the positive effects of progress. The prosecution argues that progress is good for society; the defence argues that progress will lead to unemployment and damage to society. The audience is invited to weigh the evidence and make their own conclusions.

== Cast ==
- Jimmy Hanley as Nicholas Diabolus alias Garble, Budgenot, a foreman, a machinist
- Robin Bailey as the judge
- John Glen as prosecuting counsel
- Frank Tickle as defending counsel
- Ewan Roberts as Victor Skyway
- Harry Herbert as Ephraim Oldman
- Erik Chitty as Sterling Silver
- Leslie Weston as works manager
- Bunny May as Nicholas Junior
- Edward Lexy as Clootie
- Jim Watts as Doug

== Home media ==
The film was released as part of The Renown Crime Collection Volume 9.
