= Barrier-grid animation and stereography =

Animation method

Kinegram animation of wind turbine

Barrier-grid animation or picket-fence animation is an animation effect created by moving a striped transparent overlay across an interlaced image. The barrier-grid technique originated in the late 1890s, overlapping with the development of parallax stereography (Relièphographie) for 3D autostereograms. The technique has also been used for color-changing pictures, but to a much lesser extent.

The development of barrier-grid technologies can also be regarded as a step towards lenticular printing, although the technique has remained after the invention of lenticular technologies as a relatively cheap and simple way to produce animated images in print.

== Concept ==
The barrier-grid technique uses a grid of barriers to control images reaching the viewer's eyes. The grid consists of a series of vertical or horizontal strips that can be either opaque or transparent. Typically, the barriers (opaque strips) alternate with transparent regions.

=== Animation ===
In barrier-grid animation, several images are cut into strips and interleaved. The barrier grid allows the strips from one of the interleaved images to be seen at a time. Movement of the grid relative to the interleaved image causes the viewer to see each of the images in succession.

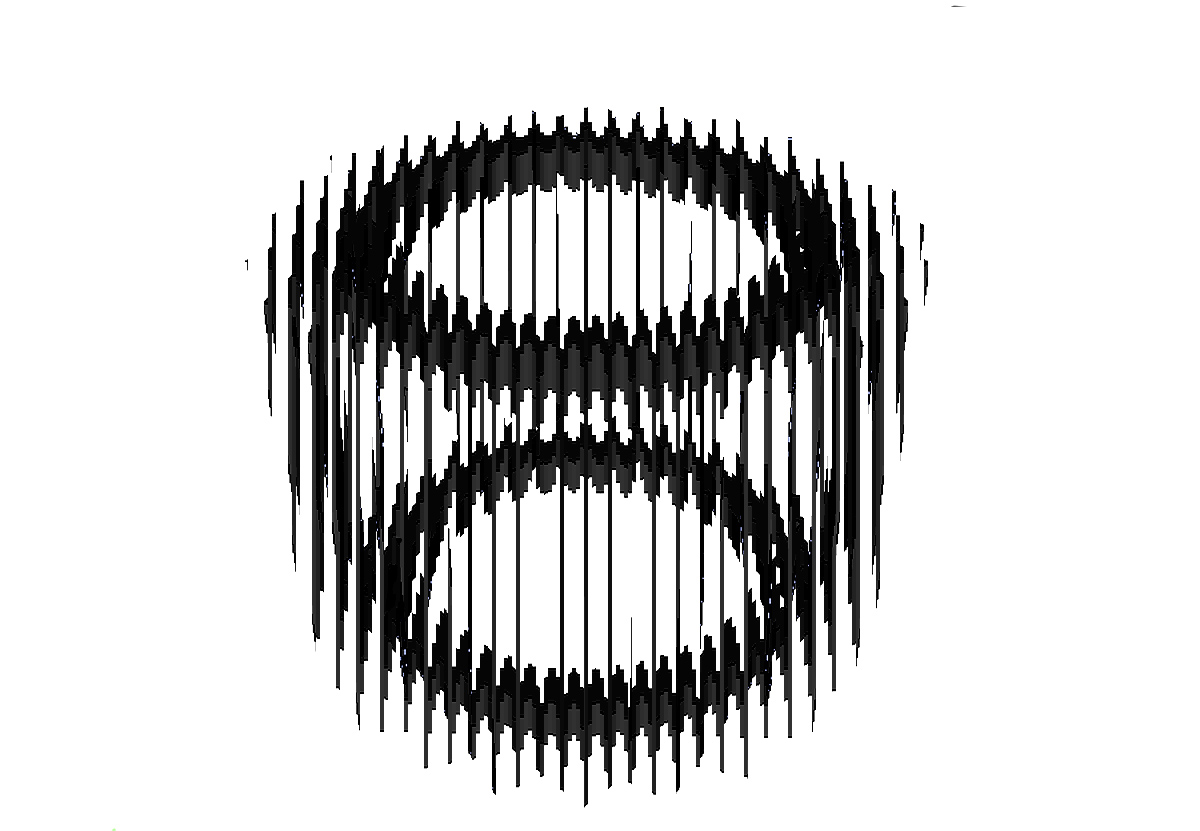
Pattern: a spinning cube

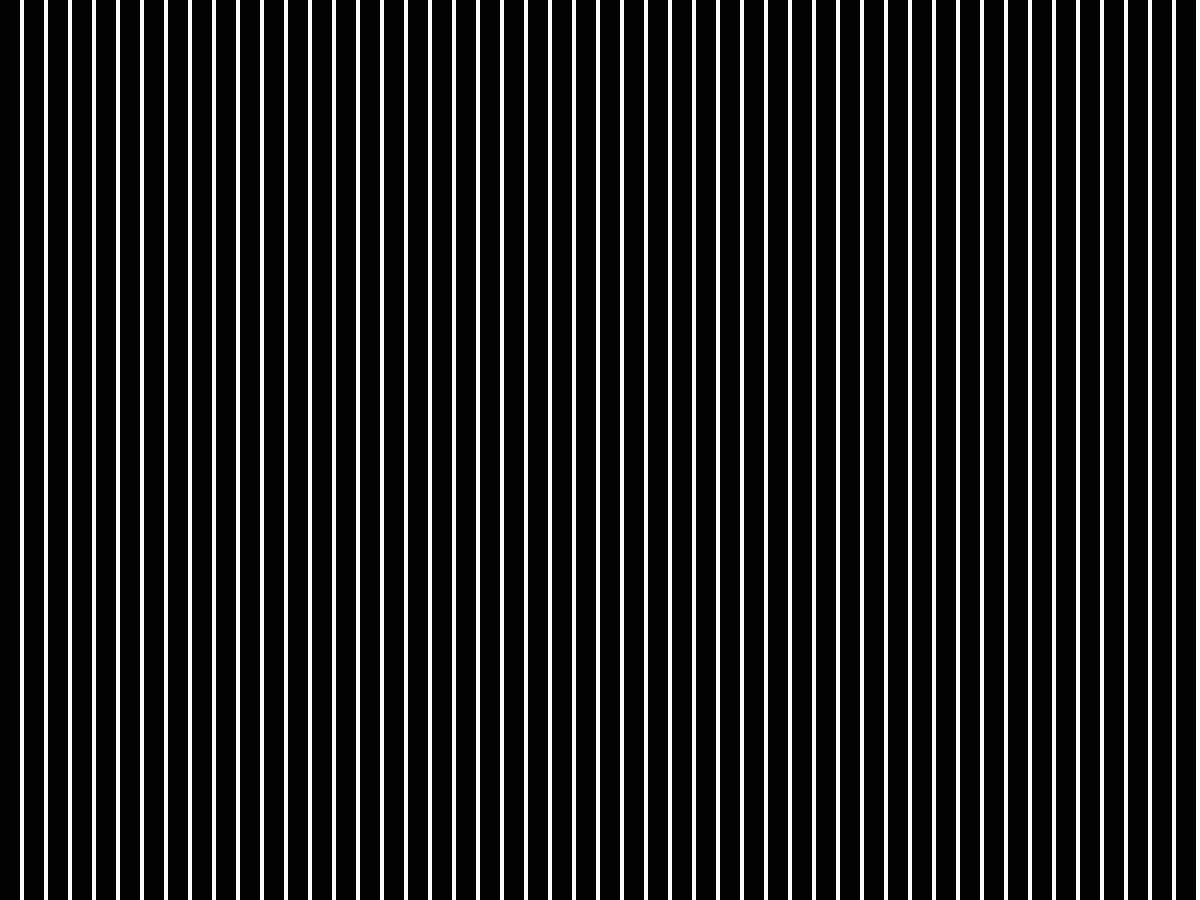
Overlay
To create the illusion of a spinning cube, "grab" the overlay with a computer mouse, and pull it over the pattern. Some computers do not support this.

=== Stereography ===
In parallax stereography, a barrier grid is placed in front of an image or a screen, with the distance between the grid and the image chosen such that the strips of image visible to each eye do not overlap. The images presented to each eye are slightly different, and are constructed such that the brain can combine them to create the illusion of depth via stereopsis. This allows viewing of 3D images without the need for specialized glasses, making it a practical and convenient solution for a wide range of applications.

== History ==
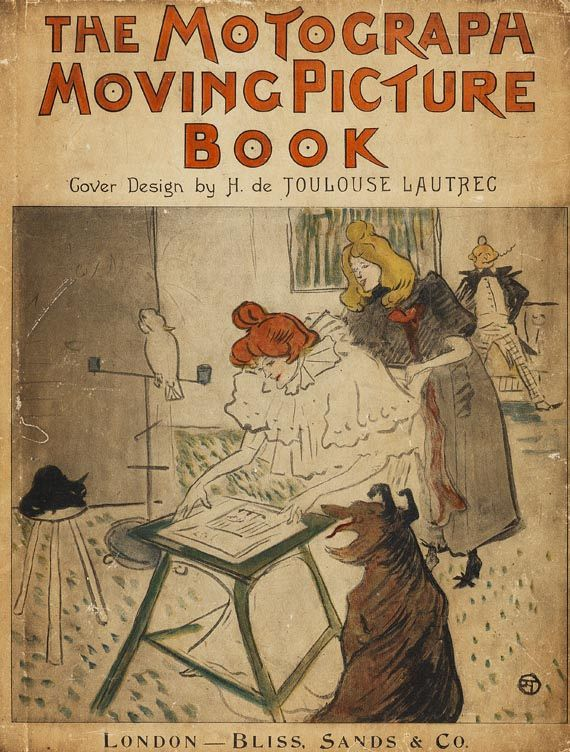
Henri de Toulouse Lautrec's cover of the new edition of "The Motograph Moving Picture Book" (1898)

Using screens for photographic printing was suggested by William Fox Talbot as "photographic screens or veils" in an 1852 patent. This resulted in several halftone processes in the next decades. For color photography the use of colored line sheets had been suggested by Louis Arthur Ducos du Hauron in 1869. Several halftone printing and color photography processes, including the 1895 Joly colour screen with >0.1 mm RGB lines, inspired the use of line screens for autostereoscopic images.

=== Motograph ===
W. Symons received British Patent No. 5,759 on March 14, 1896 for a technique that was used about two years later for the oldest known publication that used a line-sheet to create the illusion of motion in pictures.

The Motograph Moving Picture Book was published in London at the start of 1898 by Bliss, Sands & Co. It came with a "transparency" with black stripes to add the illusion of motion to the pictures in the book (13 in the original black and white edition and 23 in the later color edition). The illustrations were credited to "F.J. Vernay, Yorick, &c.".

The pictures feature different hatching patterns, causing moiré type effects when the striped transparency is moved across it. It creates a vibrant type of motion illusion with revolving wheels, billowing smoke, ripples in water, etc.

The expanded "new edition" of the book had a cover design "specially drawn for the book" by famous French painter Henri de Toulouse-Lautrec, depicting a woman viewing pictures with the transparency (accompanied by a girl, a man and three different pets).

=== Auguste Berthier's autostereograms ===
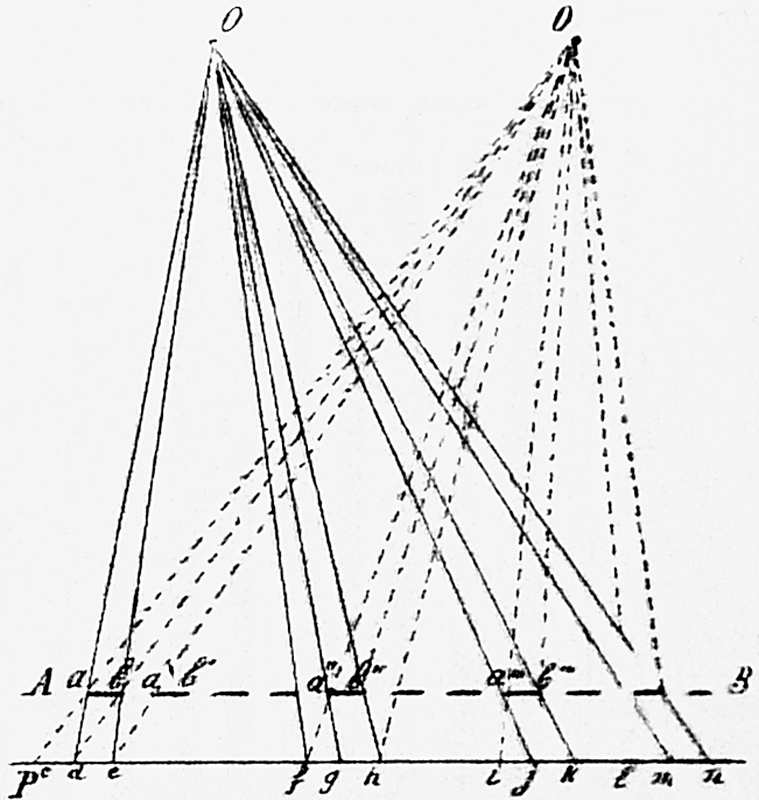
Berthier's diagram: A-B=glass plate, with a-b=opaque lines, P=Picture, O=Eyes, c-n=blocked and allowed views (Le Cosmos 05-1896)

In May 1896 Auguste Berthier published an article about the history of stereoscopic images in French scientific magazine Le Cosmos, which included his method of creating an autostereogram. Alternating strips from the left and right image of a traditional stereoscopic negative had to be recomposed as an interlaced image, preferably during the printing of the image on paper. A glass plate with opaque lines had to be fixed in front of the interlaced print with a few millimeters in between, so the lines on the screen formed a parallax barrier: from the right distance and angle each eye could only see the photographic strips shot from the corresponding angle. The article was illustrated with a diagram of the principle, an image of the two parts of a stereoscopic photograph divided into exaggerated wide bands, and the same strips recomposed as an interlaced image. Berthier's idea was hardly noticed. After Frederic Ives' similar autostereograms were presented at the French Academy of Sciences in 1904, Berthier reminded the institute about his autostereograms that he in the meantime had also managed to create in color.

=== Frederic Ives' parallax stereogram & changeable picture ===
On December 5, 1901 American inventor Frederic Eugene Ives presented his "parallax stereogram" at the Franklin Institute of the State of Pennsylvania. He claimed that he first had the idea 16 years earlier while working with the line screen in a study of "the dioptrics of half-tone screen photography". At the time he didn't think it was important enough to spend his time on. In 1901 Ives realized that he could easily adapt his Kromolinoskop color photo camera to create the stereogram and thought it would be an interesting scientific novelty worthy of presentation at the Franklin Institute. The "parallax stereogram" was a photo shot through two apertures behind the lens with a "transparent-line screen, consisting of opaque lines with clear spaces between them" in front of the sensitive plate, slightly separated from it. The line screen had 200 parallel lines per inch (79/cm) and was contact-printed from an original factory halftone screen. The technique received U.S. patent 725,567 on April 14, 1903 (application filed on September 25, 1902).

On October 11, 1904 Ives received U.S. patent 771,824 (application filed on October 27, 1903) for a "Changeable sign, picture, &c.". This was basically the same technique but with interlaced different images instead of a stereoscopic image. Shifting from one angle to the other, by passing the image or by a vibration of the image, the image would change from one to the other.

=== Eugène Estanave's animated autostereograms ===
In 1904 Léon Gaumont came across Ives' pictures at the World's Fair in St. Louis and had them presented at the French Academy of Sciences in October and the Société Française de Physique in November. Gaumont gave two parallax stereograms to the Conservatoire national des arts et métiers in 1905 and two others became part of the collection of the Société française de photographie.

French mathematician Eugène Estanave was encouraged by Gaumont to investigate the parallax stereogram and started working with the technique late in 1905. On January 24, 1906, Estanave filed for French patent 371.487 for a stereophotography device and stereoscopy using line sheets. It included his "changing" pictures that applied the principle of Ives' "Changeable sign" to animated photography, for instance the portrait of a woman with eyes open or closed depending on the viewing angle. On February 3, 1910 he requested an addition to his patent to include animated stereoscopic photography. This system used line sheets with vertical and horizontal lines, and combined four images: two stereoscopic pairs of two different moments. August 1, 1908 Estanave was granted French patent N° 392871 for an autostereoscopic photographic plate. This plate was exposed and developed to create a positive stereoscopic image, avoiding the trouble of aligning the interlaced photograph with a line screen. In the same year he was awarded a special prize at the French Academy of Sciences by Gabriel Lippmann for an x-ray stereogram. In 1911 Estanave discovered another variation: the Joly colour screen (with lines in three colors) could be adapted to create color photographs with the hues shifting when the viewing angle was changed. Fifteen examples of Estanave's stereograms are known to have survived. He seems not have commercialized any of his methods. Others marketed very similar animated portraits, usually with plastic line sheets, with some success in the 1910s and 1920s.

=== Magic moving picture cards ===
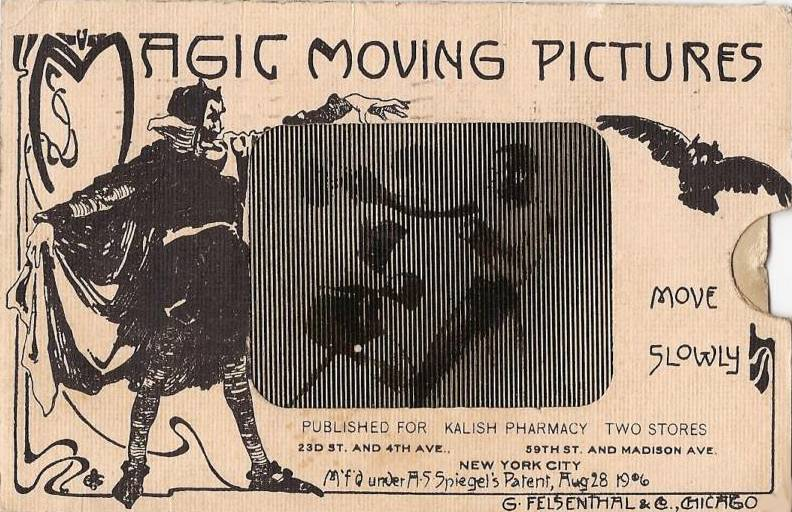
A Magic Moving Pictures card by G. Felsenthal & Co.

Magic moving pictures were composed of images containing black vertical and regularly interlaced stripes, alternating between two or three phases of a depicted motion or between distinctly different pictures. A little transparent sheet with regular vertical black stripes was glued beneath a window in a cardboard envelope holding the picture card. The card was pulled out and pushed back in to produce the illusion of change or motion.

The technique was patented in the United States on August 28, 1906, by Alexander S. Spiegel as a nameless "display device" (application date November 29, 1905). Spiegel patented several improvements, the last in 1911. Initially the pictures were drawings; later photographs were used. The postcards were marketed under Spiegel's patent as Magic moving pictures by G. Felsenthal & Co and as Magic moving picture card by the Franklin Postcard Company, both from Chicago. The latter produced a card in 1912 which enabled the viewer to choose among the portraits of three presidential candidates during that year's U.S. presidential election.

Similar cards have been published in Japan around 1920 as Cinematograph by SK and in France around 1940 as Mon cinema chez moi.

=== Ombro-Cinéma ===
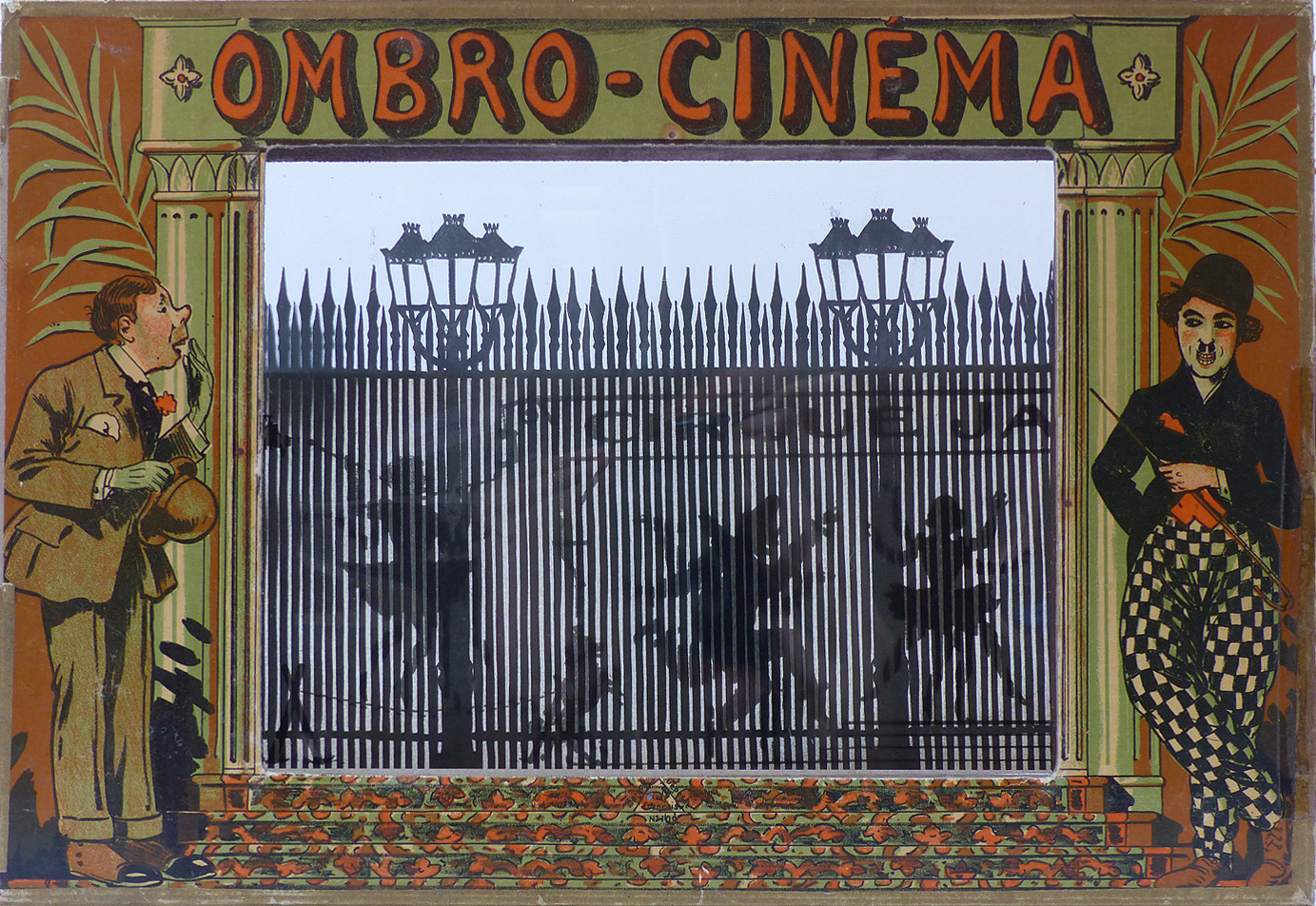
An Ombro-Cinéma by Saussine Ed. (1921)

Ombro-Cinéma toys operated on rotating scrolls of paper with sequences of images printed as interlaced two-frame animations: thin regularly-spaced vertical stripes of one frame of the animation were alternated with stripes of the next frame, alternately hidden by regularly-spaced black vertical stripes on a transparent viewing pane. In some versions the stripes on the viewing pane were disguised as a picket fence. Ombro-Cinema toys had of a wooden or cardboard chassis with a rack and hand-crank for cycling the image scroll across the viewing pane. In some versions a wind-up clockwork mechanism transferred the scroll while operating a music box.

The Ombro-Cinéma toy was produced by Saussine Ed. in Paris and patented in 1921 and six months later received a gold medal at the 19th Concours Lépine. Saussine had previously published versions with regular non-animated silhouettes on the scroll, as Ombres Chinoises (Chinese Shadows), patented in 1897. Both toys were named after and inspired by the Ombres Chinoises shadow play that had been very popular in France since 1772. Some of the animated Ombro-Cinéma toys are found with the same oriental design and Ombres Chinoises or Theatre Ombres title, but most had a design with Charlie Chaplin's Tramp character and Charles Prince's Rigadin (also interpreted as Fatty Arbuckle) on the proscenium and box. The Ombro-Cinéma received a gold medal.

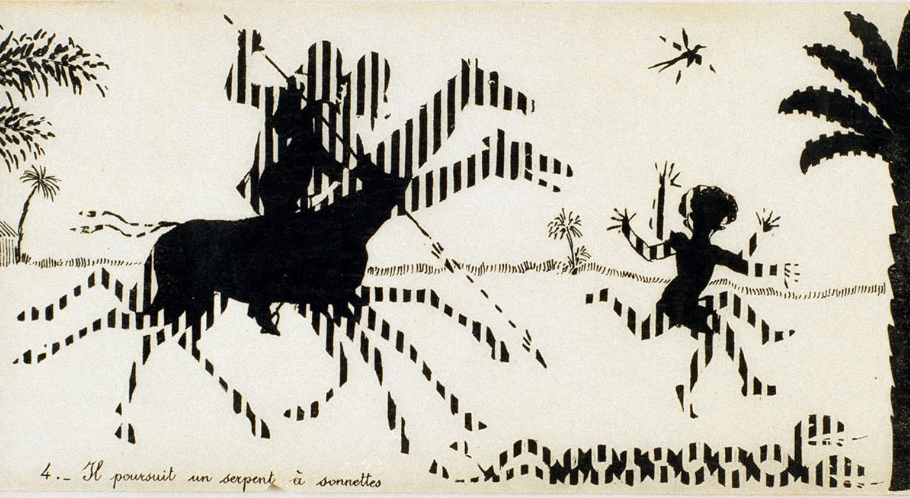
Fragment of Ombro-Cinéma Film no. 2 (without line-screen)

At least fourteen different "films" with twelve images each were available, ten in black and white and four in color. The strips varied in length from circa 2.5 meters to more than 4 meter.

Series in black and white:

- Film N° 1. Scènes des rues (Street scenes)
- Film N° 2. Aventure de Marius (Marius' adventure)
- Film N° 3. La fête de mon pays (The celebration of my country)
- Film N° 4. Tous aux sports (All about sports)
- Film N° 5. Poursuivants et poursuivis (Chasing and being chased)
- Film N° 6. Carnaval de Nice (Carnival in Nice)
- Film N° 7. Au cirque (At the circus)
- Film N° 8. Voyages de John Sellery (The travels of John Sellery)
- Film N° 9. Voyages de Gulliver (Gulliver's Travels)
- Film N° 10. Scènes exotiques (Exotic scenes)

Series in color:

- Film N° 20. Le petit Poucet (Little Thumb)
- Film N° 21. Le Chat botté (Puss in boots)
- Film N° 22. Le petit Chaperon rouge (Little Red Riding Hood)
- Film N° 23. Au jardin d'Acclimentation (At the Acclimatization Garden?)

French circular disc versions inside children's picture books were produced in the 1940s as Album télévision and Livre de Télévision.

A French version from around 1950 was named Ciné Enfantin.

Similar wind-up musical toy "televisions" have been produced until late in the 20th century.

=== Maurice Bonnet's relièphographie ===
Many inventors tried to expand the number of images that could be used in line screen technology, which was mostly limited to how wide the lines could be without making the image too dark. French inventor Maurice Bonnet (1907-1994) made several patented improvements with his Relièphographie system of the same name. He used a camera with a horizontal row of eleven lenses (French patent N° 774145, June 5, 1934), followed by one with 33 lenses in 1937 (French patent n°833891, July 2, 1937). The darkness of the images is remedied with a lightbox frame. While the pictures of Estanave could only be seen from the right viewpoint, the multiple images that formed the Relièphographs ensured a clear 3D image when viewed from different angles. Bonnet was the only creator of autostereograms with line sheet technology who managed to successfully market his technique, for which he founded his "La Relièphographie" company in 1937. About 13 extant Relièphographie pictures by Bonnet are known, including three advertisements, two portraits and eight medical subjects. With their 30x40 cm format these are the largest preserved line sheet autostereograms. Despite the success Bonnet abandoned line sheet technology after he developed a lenticular sheet around 1940.

=== Autostereoscopic cinema ===
Russian inventor Semyon Ivanov invented an autostereoscopic cinema system in 1935. In December 1940 the 180-seat theater Moscow Stereokino was built especially for autostereoscopic movies with a rear projection screen (14×19 feet) that used 50 kilometres of fine copper wire as a barrier grid on a metal framework weighing six tons. It opened to public on February 4, 1941, premiering stereoscopic concert film Kontsert (Zemlya molodosti) by Aleksandr Andrievskiy. In 1947 Ivanov helped make the first autostereoscopic feature film Robinzon Kruzo. Moscow Stereokino showed autostereoscopic movies for 18 years and four more stereokino theatres were built in Russia. Ivanov would later work on lenticular techniques. Sergei Eisenstein wrote in 1947, relating to Ivanov's work: “To doubt that stereoscopic cinema has its tomorrows, is as naïve as doubting whether there will be tomorrows at all.”

François Savoye's first Cyclostéréoscope system with a rotating grid was shown to audiences around 1945–46 at the Paris Luna Park. An improved version was shown in the Clichy Palace in Paris in 1953. The size and weight of the required installation and the limited viewing zone to view barrier-grid movies were problems that probably made most barrier-grid cinema systems financially unviable.

=== Kinegram ===
Visual artist Gianni A. Sarcone has produced animations that he calls kinegrams since 1997. He describes his animations as "optic kinetic media" that "artfully combine the visual effects of moiré patterns with the zoetrope animation technique". Sarcone also created rotating animations that use a transparent disc with radial lines that has to be spun around its center to animate the picture.

=== Scanimation ===
"Scanimation", incorporating sliding striped acetate sheets into book pages or folding cards to produce barrier-grid animations of six phases or more at each page, was produced by Rufus Butler Seder starting in 2007. The first book Gallop! was followed by Swing!, Kick, Waddle!, Santa and licensed scanimation books of Star Wars, The Wizard of Oz and Peanuts.

== See also ==
- Gas sculpture
- Lenticular printing
- History of animation
- PHSCologram
- Praxinoscope
- Zoetrope
- Zoopraxiscope
