= Parthon de Von family =

European noble family

Parthon de Von
- Noble family
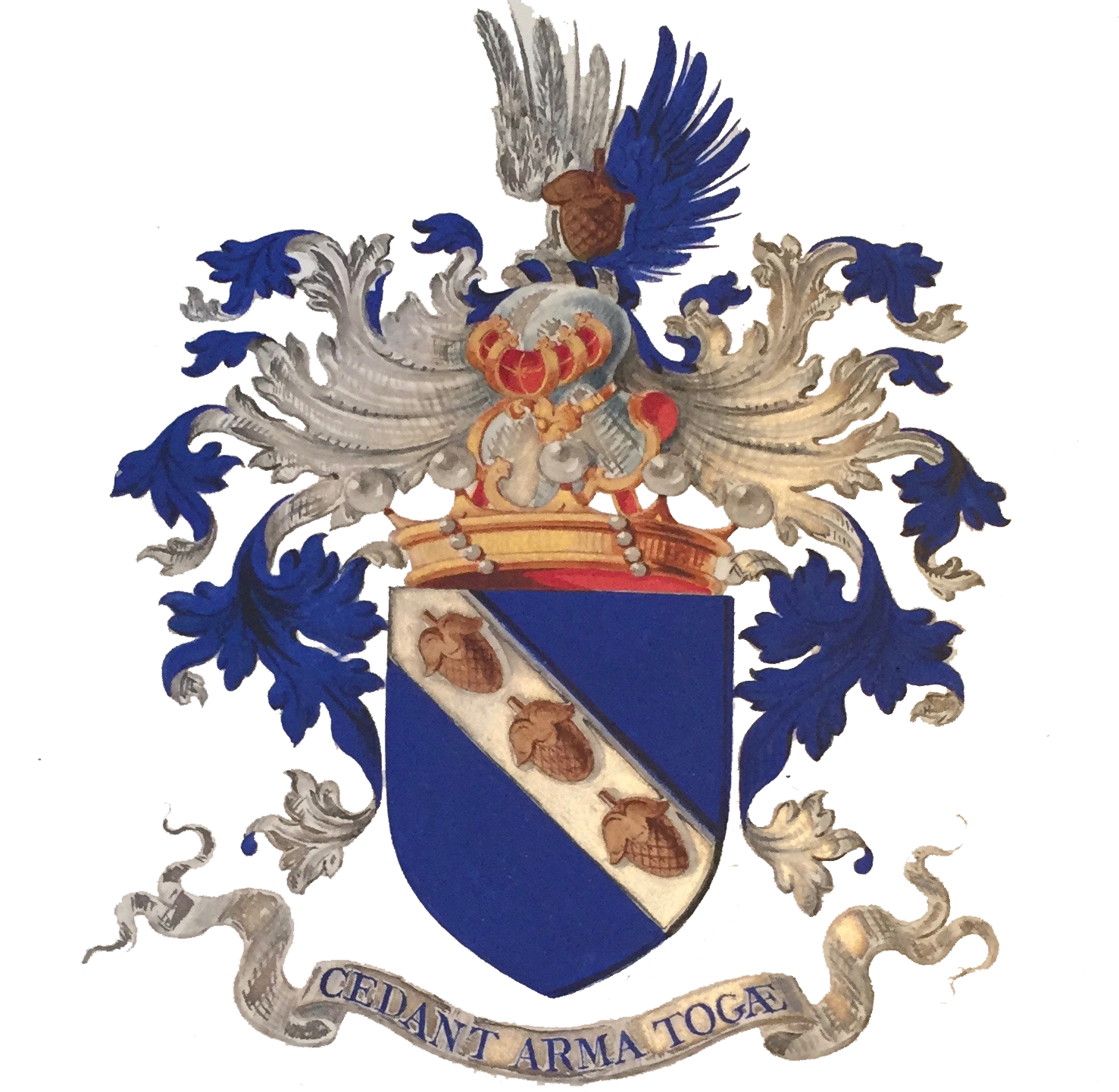
- Coat of arms
- Country: France; Belgium
- Origin: Berry
- Founded: 1575
- Titles: Squire; Knight
- Distinctions: Order of the Crown; Legion of Honor; Medal of French Gratitude; National Order of Merit; Order of Isabella the Catholic; Decoration of the Lily
- Motto: Cedant arma togae (Latin for "Let weapons yield to togas")
- Properties: Château of Von; Château of the Cornet; Château of Middelheim

The Parthon de Von family is a noble family stemming from Châteauroux in France.

Its filiation goes back to Étienne Parthon, born in 1575 and married in 1608 to Marguerite Bilhon who were the parents of Étienne Parthon, born and baptized on May 28, 1610 in Châteauroux. In the 16th century, its members held offices in the judiciary and in the Waters and Forests of the Duchy of Châteauroux. Sulpice Étienne Parthon (1714-1793), counsel and King's lawyer of the bailiwick of Châteauroux became in 1786 advocate general of the requests of the King's Hotel in Paris.

The family was naturalized Belgian and received in 1845 in Belgium a confirmation of nobility and an ennoblement as needed. The surviving branch received the title of Knight in 1845.

== History ==
=== In Châteauroux (France) ===
The proven filiation of the Parthon family dates back to Étienne Parthon, born in 1575 and married in 1608 to Marguerite Bilhon. His son Étienne Parthon was born and baptized on May 28, 1610 in Châteauroux. He married Catherine Catherinot in 1643 in Châteauroux (Saint-Denis parish). Michel Parthon, one of the leaders of the bourgeois militia of Châteauroux, became "sieur" (lord) of Von.) His son, Pierre Parthon (1649-1727), married in 1682 to Anne Marie Basset, and mayor of Châteauroux in 1689. His son, François Parthon (1683-1723), lawyer in parliament, married in 1711 Jeanne Guymon. His son, Sulpice Étienne Parthon (1714-1793), counsel and king's lawyer of the bailiwick of Châteauroux, married in 1749 Marie Pelletier. He became in July 1786 advocate general of the requests of the King's Hotel. His son, François Parthon de Von, born in Châteauroux July 18, 1763, was artillery lieutenant and married in 1779 Andrée Jeanne Rosalie Thoinnet. He was the first of his family to add the name of Von to his name. He had a son, Édouard, born on April 1, 1788 in Nantes.

=== In Belgium (since 1830) ===
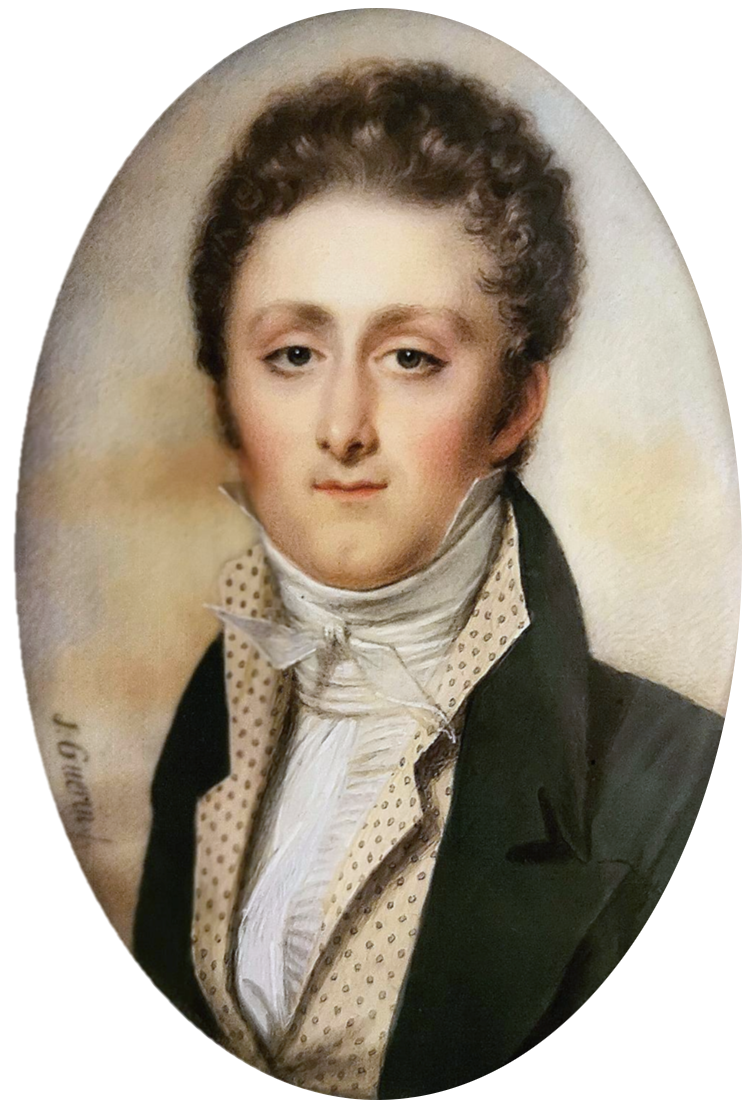
Knight Édouard Parthon de Von (1788-1877), Consul of France, painted by Jean-Urbain Guérin

The family settled in Belgium in the early 19th century with Édouard Parthon de Von (1788-1877). Consul of France in Ostend in 1815, made knight of the French Legion of Honour in 1827, he was appointed consul of France in Antwerp in 1829. After the July Revolution in 1830, he refused to serve the new government and resigned as consul of France. He settled near Anvers at the Château de Middelheim and he devoted himself to horticulture and writing. He published a book of fables in 1843. The Belgian horticulturist Charles Morren dedicated to him the Orchiaceae Parthoni. From his marriage on May 31, 1813 to Jeanne Catherine Victoire van de Velde (1796–1847), he had a daughter and two sons, Édouard (1814) and Édouard Henri (1819) who were naturalized Belgian and received in Belgium in 1845 a confirmation of nobility and an ennoblement as needed.

Édouard Parthon de Von (1814-1897), received a transmissible title of knight in 1845. and married in 1849 Amélie de Coopmans. This branch remains.

Édouard-Henri Parthon de Von (1819-1892) received a title of knight in 1871 and died without descendants.

The family settled in Anvers, Soignies, Tournai and Brussels. Alphonse-Henri Parthon de Von became burgomaster of Horrues in 1890, his son Édouard-Joseph Parthon de Von was Vice-consul of Spain and Argentina in Tournai. One of its member was a prisoner of war during World War II, etc.

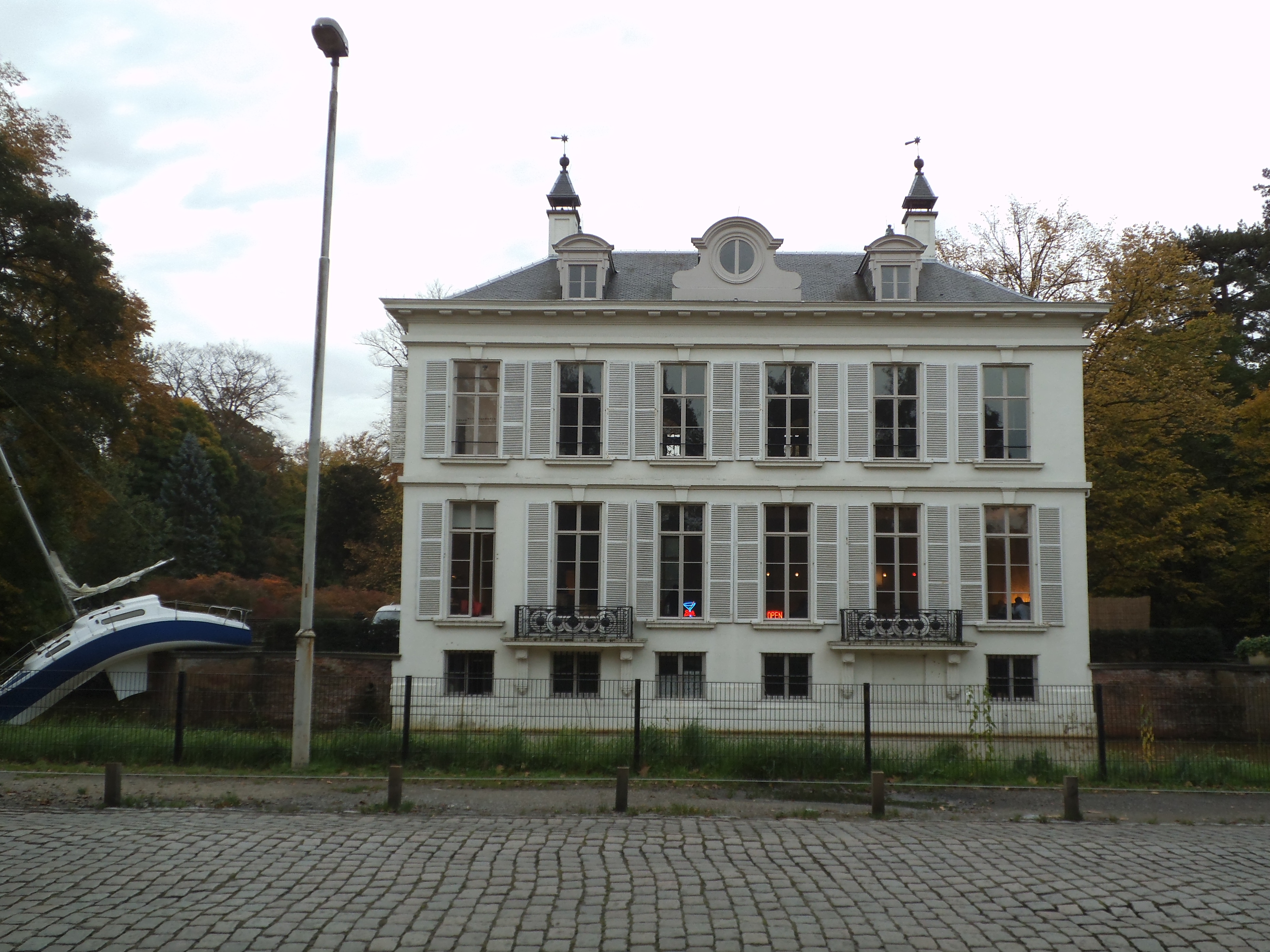
Château de Middelheim

== Ennoblement and titles ==
- In Belgium, by royal decree of June 18, 1844 and letters patent of January 2, 1845 Édouard Parthon de Von and his brother Édouard Henri Parthon de Von received a confirmation of nobility and an ennoblement as needed.
- By letters patent of January 2, 1845 Édouard Parthon de Von was granted the title of knight, transmissible in the male line by primogeniture. This branch remains.
- By letters patent of June 25, 1871, Édouard Henri Parthon de Von was granted the title of knight, transmissible to all his male descendants. He died without descendants.

In a letter dated July 19, 1843 addressed to the prince of Ligne, Ambassador H.M. the King of Belgians to France, François Guizot, French Minister of Foreign Affairs, wrote "There is no doubt about the right exercised by Mr. Parthon de Von, today Honorary Consul of France, to bear since the first years of the Restoration the title of Chevalier. He belongs to a noble family, whose nobility dates back before the century of Louis XIV (…) and even if this family had not enjoyed nobility at that time, possession would have been acquired at that time. The branch from which the plaintiffs descend, because one of their ancestors, general counsel for the requests of the hotel dependent on the Parliament of Paris, would have benefited from the benefit of a royal ordinance dated November 6, 1657, by which they are declared noble and their posterity, those of the lawyers, advisers and masters of requests of the hotel who would not be from noble race..."

Contrary to what François Guizot wrote in 1843, the first members of the Parthon family (Étienne Parthon married in 1608 to Marguerite Bilhon, Étienne Parthon, married in 1643 to Catherine Catherinot, Pierre Parthon (1649-1727), married in 1682 to Anne Basset, Sulpice Étienne Parthon, married to Marie Pelletier etc.) are bourgeois of Châteauroux and do not bear any noble qualification in the acts.

Also, Sulpice Étienne Parthon de Von (1714-1793) became general advocate in 1786 at the requests of the king's hotel in Paris, but this office required 20 years of practice before conferring nobility.

== Lineage ==
The Annuaire de la noblesse de Belgique (1851), État présent de la noblesse du royaume de Belgique (1960) and État présent de la noblesse belge (2002) provide the following family lineage :

- Knight Sulpice Étienne Parthon de Von (1714-1793) ∞ Marie Le Pelletier dit de Martainville.
  - Knight François Parthon de Von (1753-1812) ∞ Andrée Thoinnet de La Turmelière.
    - Knight Édouard Parthon de Von (1788-1877) ∞ Jeanne van de Velde.
      - Knight Édouard Parthon de Von (1814-1897) ∞ Countess Amélie de Coopmans.
        - Knight Alphonse Parthon de Von (1858-1932) ∞ Marie Fontaine de Ghélin.
          - Knight Édouard Parthon de Von (1881-1945) ∞ Yvonne de Séjournet de Rameignies.
            - Knight Étienne Parthon de Von (1916-1989) ∞ Françoise de Bonnières.
              - Knight François Parthon de Von (1964-) ∞ Sophie de La Peschardière.
                - Gautier Parthon de Von, squire (1996-) ∞ Christina de Harenne.
              - Lieutenant-colonel Gérard Parthon de Von (1966-) ∞ Florence d'Eimar de Jabrun.
      - Knight Édouard Henri Parthon de Von (1819-1892).

== Heraldry ==
Coat of arms of Parthon de Von family
Coronet Ensigned with a hereditary knight coronet, surmounted by an argent helmet Crest Azure, on a bend argent Escutcheon Three proper pine cones pendent of the first Supporters Collared by gold, torse and mantling azure and argent Motto Cedant arma togae (Latin for "Let weapons yield to togas")

== Sepulture ==
It holds a perpetual concession for its members in the Laeken Cemetery in Brussels, Belgium.

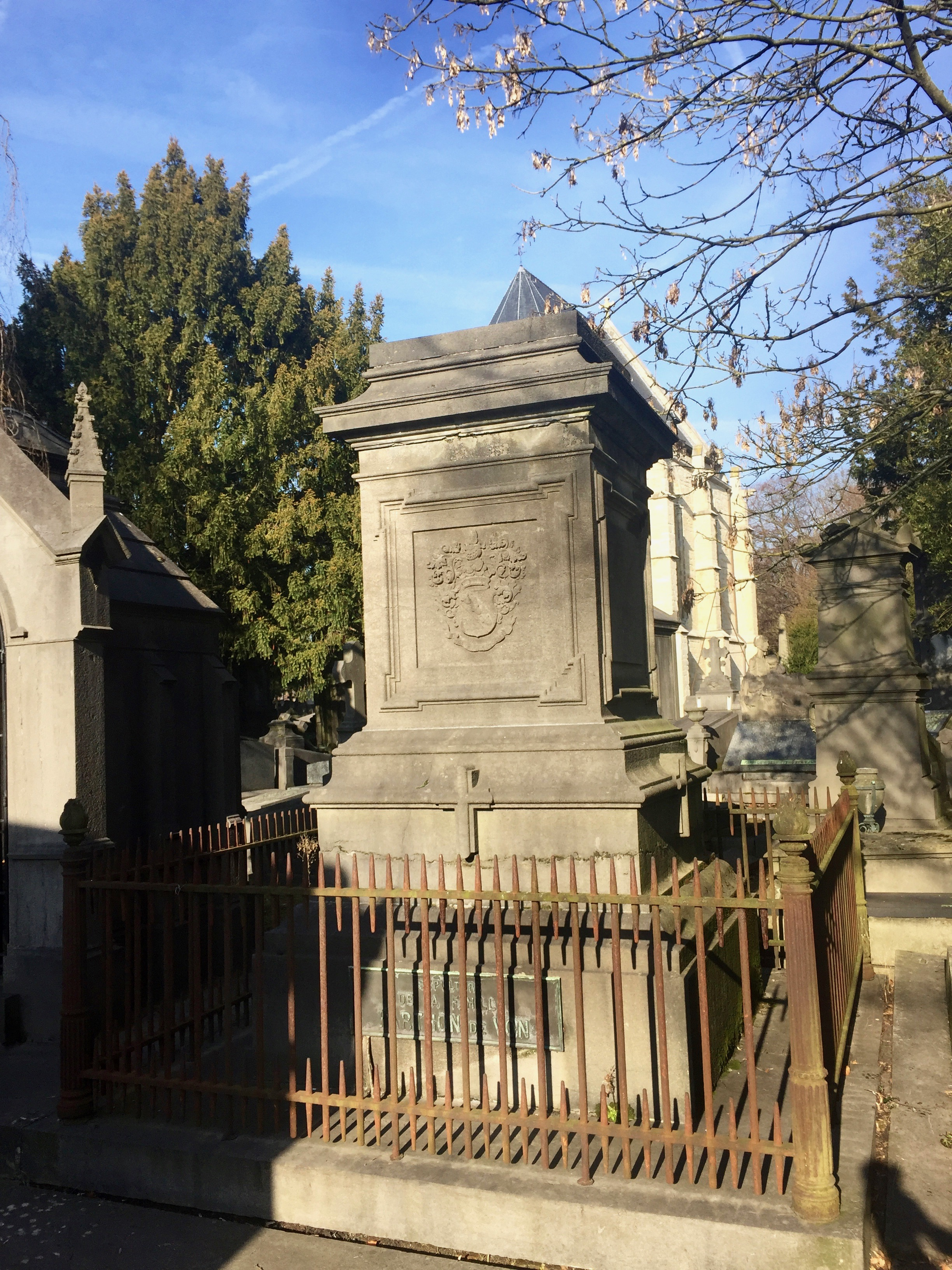

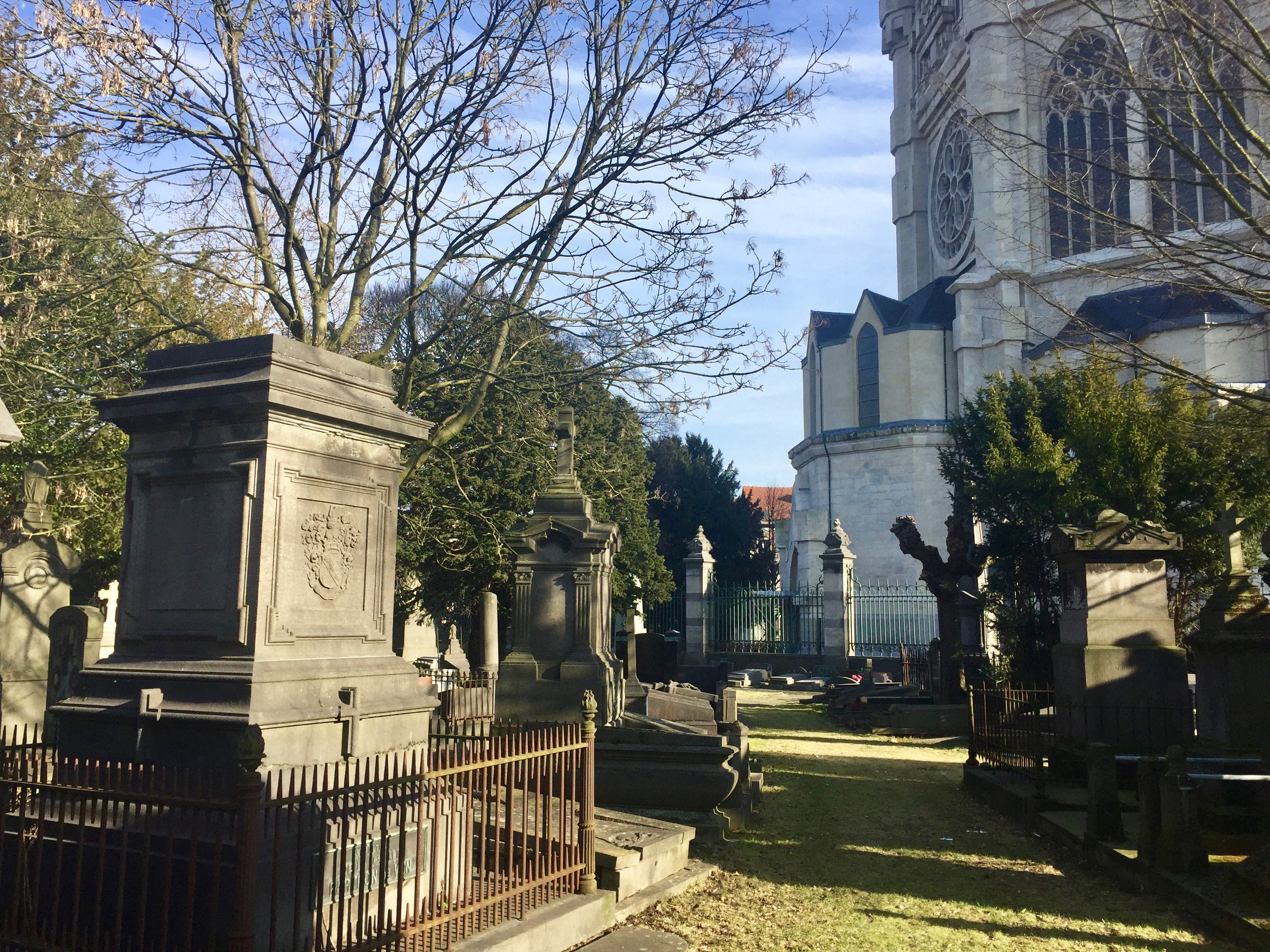

== Alliances ==
Bilhon (1608), Catherinot (1643), Basset (1682), Guymon (1711), Pelletier (1749), Thoinnet de La Turmelière (1779), Van de Velde (1813), de Coopmans(1849), Cogels, Fontaine de Ghélin (1880), du Bois (1880), de Séjournet de Rameignies (1905), de La Kethulle de Ryhove (1928), de Bonnières (1962), Béchet de La Peschardière (1984), d'Eimar de Jabrun, Thélot (2012), Fayet (2013), Bernard, de Harenne (2025), etc.

== Resources ==
=== Bibliography ===
- Annuaire de la noblesse de Belgique, Volume 5, 1851, page 248.
- Charles Poplimont, La Belgique héraldique,, tome 8, 1866, page 266.
- La noblesse belge, Partie 1, 1893, page 234.
- baron Fernand de Ryckman de Betz, Armorial général de la noblesse belge, H. Dessain, 1957, page 356.
- Oscar Coomans of Brachène, this State of the Belgian nobility, the 1979 Yearbook, second part P-Pos, Brussels, 1979.
- Grands notables du Premier Empire : Indre, Centre national de la recherche scientifique, 1994.
- Jean-François Houtart, Belgium Old families, LXI Collection of the Royal Family Office Association and heraldry of Belgium, Brussels, 2008.

=== Related articles ===
- List of Noble families in Belgium
- Belgian Nobility
