= List of fellows of the Royal Society elected in 1892 =

Fellows of the Royal Society elected in 1892.

== Fellows ==
1. Robert Young Armstrong (1839–1894)
2. Frank Evers Beddard (1858–1925)
3. Spencer Compton Cavendish (1833–1908)
4. John Ambrose Fleming (1849–1945)
5. Sir Clement le Neve Foster (1841–1904)
6. Hans Friedrich Gadow (1855–1928)
7. Robert Giffen (1837–1910)
8. Francis Gotch (1853–1913)
9. William Abbott Herdman (1858–1924)
10. Farrer Herschell (1837–1899)
11. Frederick Hutton (1836–1905)
12. John Joly (1857–1933)
13. Sir Joseph Larmor (1857–1942)
14. Louis Compton Miall (1842–1921)
15. John Morley (1838–1923)
16. Benjamin Neeve Peach (1842–1926)
17. Alexander Pedler (1849–1918)
18. Augustus Desiré Waller (1856–1922)

== Foreign members ==
1. Wilhelm Kühne (1837–1900)
2. Eleuthere Elie Nicolas Mascart (1837–1908)
3. Dmitri Mendeleev (1834–1907) published the first widely recognized periodic table in 1869
4. Hubert Anson Newton (1830–1896)
