= Cyril Bencraft Joly =

- Born: September 9, 1918
- Died: 2000 (aged 81–82)
- Military career
- Allegiance: United Kingdom
- Branch: British Army
- Commands: C Squadron 3 Royal Tank Regiment
- Conflicts: Second World War

Lt Colonel Cyril Bencraft Joly MC (9 September 1918 – 2000) was a British Army officer who served with 7th Armoured Division (Desert Rats) throughout the campaign in North Africa during World War II.

He described his experiences as a squadron commander in the Royal Tank Regiment (RTR) in Take These Men (1955), a (lightly fictionalised) personal narrative of the Western Desert campaign that is regarded as a classic of its kind. During Operation Crusader he served in the 3rd Royal Tank Regiment (3 RTR).

== Life ==
He was born in Mengtes, Yunnan, China and died at Winchester in Hampshire.

Later in life he invented and patented an apparatus for providing a desired atmosphere in a sleeping space. It consisted of a frame for a bed with electrical fans to control the temperature.

In his later days he lived at Tregatillian near St Columb Major in Cornwall

== Family ==
Henry Bencraft Joly (1857-1898; his grandfather) was British Vice-Consul in Macao and translator of Ts'ao Chan's Hung Lou Meng: The Dream of the Red Chamber, a Chinese Novel in Two Books. He had three brothers. His only daughter, Vivien, married Hugh David Beddington, son of Keith Lionel Beddington CBE.

== Works ==
- 1955 Take These Men (London, Constable and Company Ltd; reprinted Harmondsworth, Penguin Books, 1956; London, Buchan & Enright, 1985) ISBN 0-907675-40-9
- 1980 Silent Night: the defeat of NATO . London: Cassell ISBN 0-586-06847-3
  - Operation Stille Nacht ISBN 3-7057-2018-X
