= Van Eetvelde =

Van Eetvelde may refer to:

- Edmond van Eetvelde (1852–1925), administrator of the Congo Free State.
- Miranda Van Eetvelde (born 1959), Belgian politician
- Hôtel van Eetvelde, house in Belgium
