= Cathy Jolly =

American politician

Member of the Missouri House of Representatives
- In office 2001–2007

Personal details
- Born: September 8, 1972 (age 53) St. Louis, Missouri, U.S.
- Party: Democratic
- Education: University of Missouri (BA); University of Missouri–Kansas City (JD)

Cathy Jolly (born September 8, 1972) is an American attorney and politician who served as a member of the Missouri House of Representatives from 2001 to 2007.

== Background ==
Born in St. Louis, Missouri, she attended the University of Missouri and the University of Missouri–Kansas City School of Law. She has worked as an attorney and as the assistant prosecuting attorney for Jackson County, Missouri.
