= Warren Jolly =

Warren Jolly, born 1983, is an Indian-American Internet Entrepreneur and CEO of adQuadrant, an online media company based out of Costa Mesa, California.

Jolly co-founded the company in 2002 at the age of 19. In 2009, the company made the Inc. 500 at #129.

adQuadrant received awards from Map Consulting in 2008 and two Inc. awards in 2009 for ranking No. 14 in Los Angeles-Long Beach-Santa Ana, CA and No. 15 in Advertising and Marketing.
