= John Joly =

Irish geologist and physicist (1857–1933)

John Joly FRS
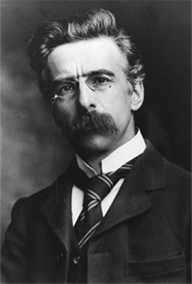
- Born: 1 November 1857; Bracknagh, King's County, Ireland
- Died: 8 December 1933 (aged 76); Dublin, Ireland
- Education: Trinity College Dublin (M.A., 1882)
- Known for: Joly colour screen; Age of Earth; Cohesion-tension theory; pioneering radiotherapy
- Relatives: Charles Jasper Joly (cousin)
- Awards: FRS (1892); Royal Medal (1910); Boyle Medal (1911); Murchison Medal (1923)
- Scientific career
- Fields: Geology; Physics
- Workplaces: Royal Dublin Society

John Joly (/ˈdʒoʊli/; 1 November 1857 – 8 December 1933) was an Irish geologist and physicist known for his development of radiotherapy in the treatment of cancer. In 1914, he worked with Walter Stevenson to establish the Irish Radium Institute, where they jointly developed the "Dublin method" for deep radiotherapy using hollow needles. He is also known for developing techniques to more accurately estimate the age of a geological period, based on radioactive elements present in minerals, the uranium–thorium dating.

== Early life ==
Joly was born in Holywood House (the Church of Ireland Rectory), Bracknagh, Kings's County, Ireland. He was a second cousin of astronomer Charles Jasper Joly. He entered Trinity College, Dublin in 1876, graduating in Engineering in 1882 in first place with several special certificates in branches of engineering, at the same time obtaining a First Class Honours in modern literature. He worked as a demonstrator in Trinity's Engineering and Physics departments before succeeding William Johnson Sollas in the Chair of Geology and Mineralogy in 1897, a position which he held until his death in 1933 in Dublin. A keen yachtsman, he served as a Commissioner for Irish Lights.

== Scientific career ==
Joly joined the Royal Dublin Society in 1881 while still a student, and was a frequent contributor of papers. His first scientific paper was published in 1883, on the use of meteorological instruments at a distance. He published over 270 scientific papers.

In 1886, Joly proposed a theory on the slipperiness of ice. According to Joly, when the ice is forced to contract by the pressure applied, a film of liquid water is formed, upon which actual slipping occurs. Although this theory has recently been superseded, it was the first time someone tried to explain the mechanism behind ice low friction.

On 17 May 1899 Joly read his paper, "An Estimate of the Geological Age of the Earth", to the Royal Dublin Society. In it, he proposed to calculate the age of the Earth from the accumulation of sodium in the waters of the oceans. He calculated the rate at which the oceans should have accumulated sodium from erosion processes, and determined that the oceans were about 80 to 100 million years old. The paper was quickly published, appearing 4 months later in the Society's Scientific Transactions. Although this method was later considered inaccurate and was consequently superseded, it radically modified the results of other methods in use at the time.

In 1903 he published an article in Nature in which he discussed the possibility of using radium to date the Earth and went on to study the radioactive content of the Earth's crust to formulate a theory of thermal cycles, and examined the radioactive constituents of certain rocks as a means of calculating their age. Working in collaboration with Sir Ernest Rutherford, he used radioactive decay in minerals to estimate, in 1913, that the beginning of the Devonian period could not be less than 400 million years ago, an estimate which is in line with modern calculations.

Joly served as President of Section C (Geology) when the British Association for the Advancement of Science which met in Dublin in 1908, during which he presented his paper "Uranium and Geology" an address to the society. This work described radioactive materials in rocks and their part in the generation of the Earth's internal heat.

Along with his friend Henry Horatio Dixon, Joly also put forward the cohesion-tension theory which is now thought to be the main mechanism for the upward movement of water in plants.

In 1914, he developed a method of extracting radium and applied it in the treatment of cancer. As a Governor of Dr Steevens' Hospital in Dublin, in collaboration with Walter Stevenson he devised radiotherapy methods and promoted the establishment by the Royal Dublin Society of the Irish Radium Institute where they pioneered the "Dublin method" of using a hollow needle for deep radiotherapy, a technique that later entered worldwide use. The Radium Institute also supplied capillary tubes containing radon to hospitals for some years for use in the treatment of tumours.

== Inventions ==
Joly invented a photometer for measuring light intensity, a meldometer for measuring the melting points of minerals, a differential steam calorimeter for measuring specific heats and a constant-volume gas thermometer, all of which bear his name, together with one of the first color photographic processes, the Joly colour screen. It was the first successful process for producing color images from a single photographic plate.

== Awards and honours ==
=== Awards ===
- 1892: Fellowship of the Royal Society
- 1910: Royal Medal of the Royal Society
- 1911: Boyle Medal of the Royal Dublin Society
- 1923: Murchison Medal of the Geological Society of London

=== Honours ===
After his death, his friends subscribed the sum of £1,700 to set up a memorial fund which is still used to promote the annual Joly Memorial Lectures at Trinity College Dublin, which were inaugurated by Ernest Rutherford in 1935. He is also remembered by the Joly Geological Society, a student geological association established in 1960.

In 1930, Oliver Sheppard was commissioned by Trinity College Dublin and the Royal Dublin Society to make them copies of a bust of Joly.

In 1973, Joly, an impact crater on Mars, was named in his honour.
