= Jollie =

Jollie is a surname. Notable people with the surname include:

- Edward Jollie (1825–1894), a pioneer land surveyor in New Zealand
- Ethel Tawse Jollie (1874–1950), writer and political activist in Southern Rhodesia, first female parliamentarian in the British overseas empire
- Francis Jollie (1815–1870), New Zealand settler and politician
- Thomas Jollie, (1629–1703), English Dissenter, a minister ejected from the Church of England for his beliefs
- Timothy Jollie (c. 1659–1714), English nonconformist minister and educator

== See also ==
- Jolley (surname), a list of people surnamed either Jolley or Jolly
