= Terry Jolley =

English footballer

Personal information
- Full name: Terence Arthur Jolley
- Date of birth: 13 April 1959 (age 67)
- Place of birth: Bermondsey, England
- Height: 5 ft 11 in (1.80 m)
- Position: Forward

Youth career
- Queens Park Rangers
- 1976: Gillingham

Senior career*
Years	Team	Apps	(Gls)
1976–1980	Gillingham	21	(5)
1980–1982	Dover		
1982–1983	Gravesend & Northfleet		
1983–1986	Folkestone		
- * Club domestic league appearances and goals

Terence Arthur Jolley (born 13 April 1959) is an English former professional footballer who was active in the 1970s and 1980s. He made 21 appearances in The Football League for Gillingham.

== Career ==
Jolley joined Queens Park Rangers as a schoolboy before signing an apprentice contract with Gillingham in July 1976. Four months later he signed a professional contract with the club. He made his debut for the team in a 2–0 defeat away to Brighton & Hove Albion in December 1976, but it was to prove to be the only game he played that season. Although he scored goals regularly with the reserve team, he struggled to break into the first team and did not play for them again until October 1978, when he came on as a substitute and scored the second goal in a 2–0 victory over Hull City. He finished the season with 14 league and cup appearances and 5 goals, including scoring twice in a 3–3 draw with Bury.

Despite having been a semi-regular in the team in the 1978–79 season and their fourth-highest goalscorer, Jolley only made seven appearances in the following campaign, and was allowed to leave the club, joining Dover in September 1980 for a transfer fee of £4,000, a new record for the highest fee paid by the club. He later briefly played for Gravesend & Northfleet before joining Folkestone, whose manager Alf Bentley had also managed him at Dover. He played 173 games for the club and scored 74 goals, but his playing career came to an end when he suffered a compound leg fracture during a game in January 1986. His former club Gillingham sent a team to play Folkestone in a benefit match for him later that year.
