= Joly colour screen =

Photography process

The Joly colour process is an early additive colour photography process devised by Dublin physicist John Joly in 1894.

== Description ==
Based on a method proposed in 1869 by Louis Ducos du Hauron in Les Couleurs en Photographie – Solution du Probleme, the Joly colour process used a glass screen with fine red, green and blue-violet lines, each less than 1/225 inch (about 0.1 mm) wide. The lines were ruled with aniline dyes mixed with gum on a gelatin-coated glass plate, in contact with one another but not overlapping. The plate acted as a series of very fine filters, in a similar way to the later Paget process.

To take a photograph, the filter screen was placed in the camera in front of an orthochromatic photographic plate, so that the light passed through the filter before striking the emulsion. Because orthochromatic plates were excessively sensitive to blue light, a yellow filter was used over the lens. After exposure, the plate was separated from the screen, developed and contact-printed on another plate to make a positive black-and-white transparency. This was then placed in register with a viewing screen of the same type as used for exposure, to produce a limited-colour transparency that could be viewed by transmitted light.

The Joly process was introduced commercially in 1895 and remained on the market for a few years. However, it was expensive and the commercially available emulsions of the time were not sensitive to the full range of the spectrum, so the final colour image could not achieve the look of "natural colour".

A large collection of colour slides by John Joly, mainly of botanical subjects, are held by the National Library of Ireland.

== See also ==
- Paget process
