= William Jolley =

English cricketer

Personal information
- Full name: William Turner Jolley
- Born: 3 August 1923; Smallthorne, Staffordshire, England
- Died: 28 April 1995 (aged 71); Stoke-on-Trent, Staffordshire, England
- Batting: Right-handed
- Bowling: Right-arm fast

Domestic team information
- Years: Team
- 1949–1956: Staffordshire
- 1947: Lancashire

Career statistics
Competition	First-class
Matches	2
Runs scored	21
Batting average	21.00
100s/50s	–/–
Top score	13
Balls bowled	281
Wickets	5
Bowling average	26.40
5 wickets in innings	–
10 wickets in match	–
Best bowling	4/31
Catches/stumpings	5/–
- Source: Cricinfo, 2 November 2013

William Turner Jolley (3 August 1923 – 28 April 1995) was an English cricketer. Jolley was a right-handed batsman who bowled right-arm fast. He was born at Smallthorne, Staffordshire.

Jolley made his first-class debut for Lancashire against Nottinghamshire at Old Trafford in the 1947 County Championship, with him playing one further first-class match in that same season against Hampshire. He took 5 wickets in his two matches, with best figures of 4/31, while with the bat he scored 21 runs with a high score of 13. After leaving Lancashire, Jolley debuted in minor counties cricket for Staffordshire against Durham in the 1949 Minor Counties Championship. He played minor counties cricket for Staffordshire until 1956, making a total of 25 appearances.

He died at Stoke-on-Trent, Staffordshire on 28 April 1995.
