= Joly (crater) =

Crater on Mars

Joly is an impact crater on Mars, located at 74.7°S latitude and 42.7°W longitude in the Mare Australe quadrangle. It measures 79.9 kilometres (49.6 mi) in diameter and was named after Irish physicist John Joly (1857–1933). The name was approved in 1973, by the International Astronomical Union (IAU) Working Group for Planetary System Nomenclature (WGPSN).

== Spiders ==
During the winter, much frost accumulates. It freezes out directly onto the surface of the permanent polar cap, which is made of water ice covered with layers of dust and sand. The deposit begins as a layer of dusty CO_{2} frost. Over the winter, it recrystallizes and becomes denser. The dust and sand particles caught in the frost slowly sink. By the time temperatures rise in the spring, the frost layer has become a slab of semi-transparent ice about 0.91 metres (3.0 ft) thick, lying on a substrate of dark sand and dust. This dark material absorbs light and causes the ice to sublimate (turn directly into a gas) Eventually much gas accumulates and becomes pressurized. When it finds a weak spot, the gas escapes and blows out the dust. Speeds can reach 161 kilometres per hour (100 mph). Dark channels can sometimes be seen; they are called "spiders." The surface appears covered with dark spots when this process is occurring.

Many ideas have been advanced to explain these features. These features can be seen in some of the pictures below.

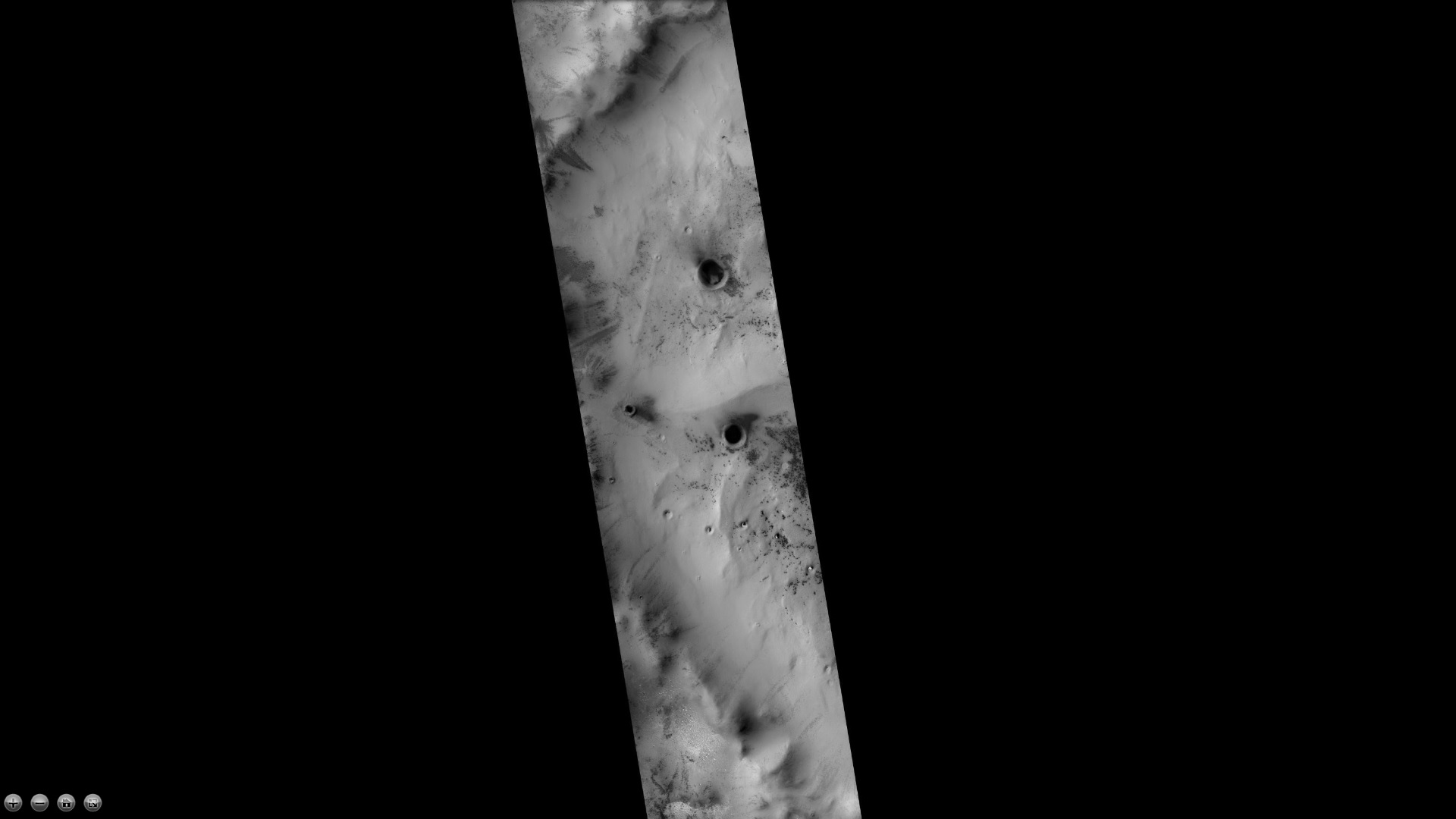
West side of Joly (crater), as seen by CTX camera (on Mars Reconnaissance Orbiter).

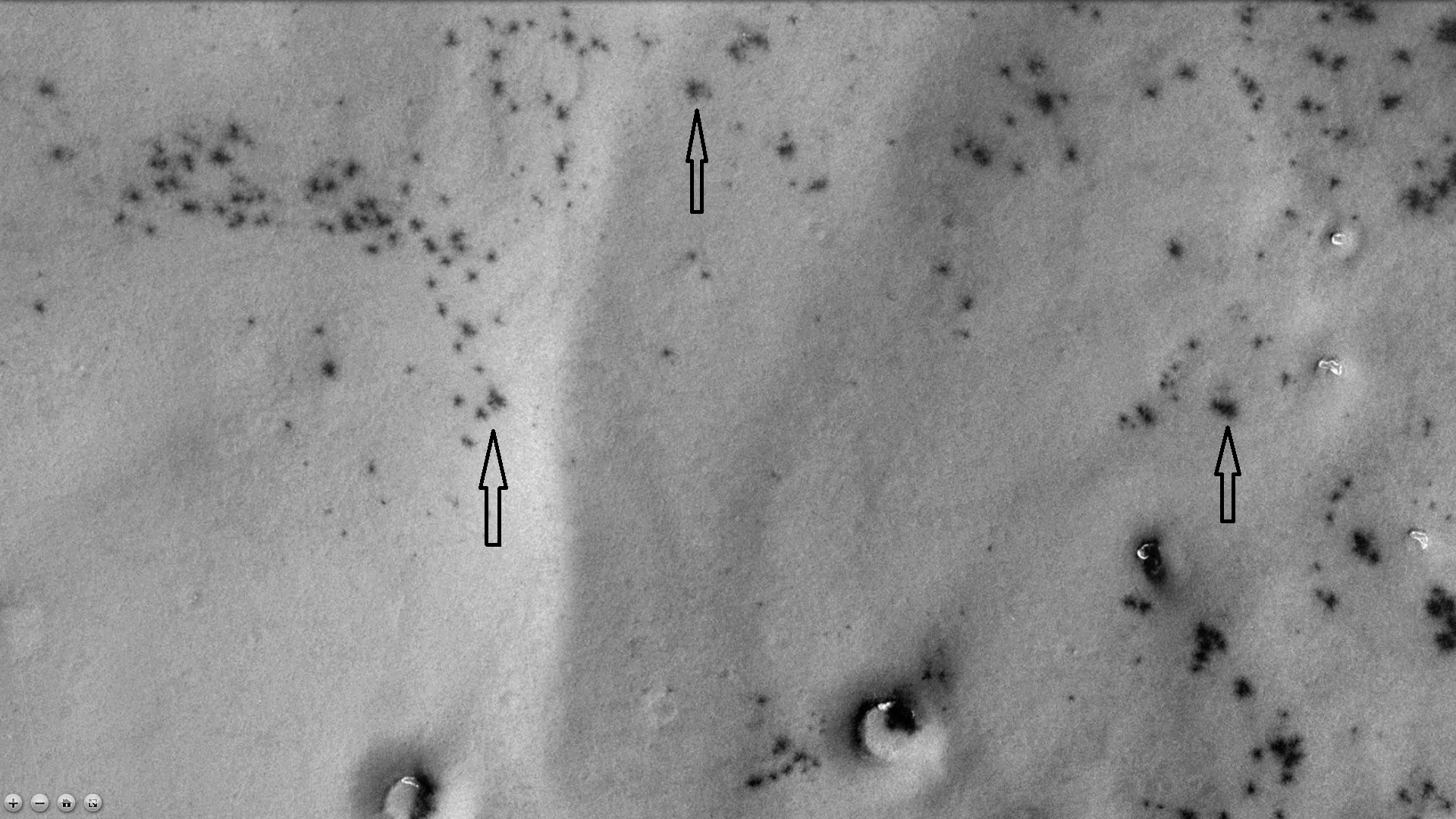
Dark spots and "spiders" in Joly crater, as seen by CTX camera (on Mars Reconnaissance Orbiter). "Spiders" appear as fuzzy spots; they are where dark dust is accumulating in channels below clear slabs of frozen carbon dioxide. Note: this is an enlargement of the previous image of Joly crater.

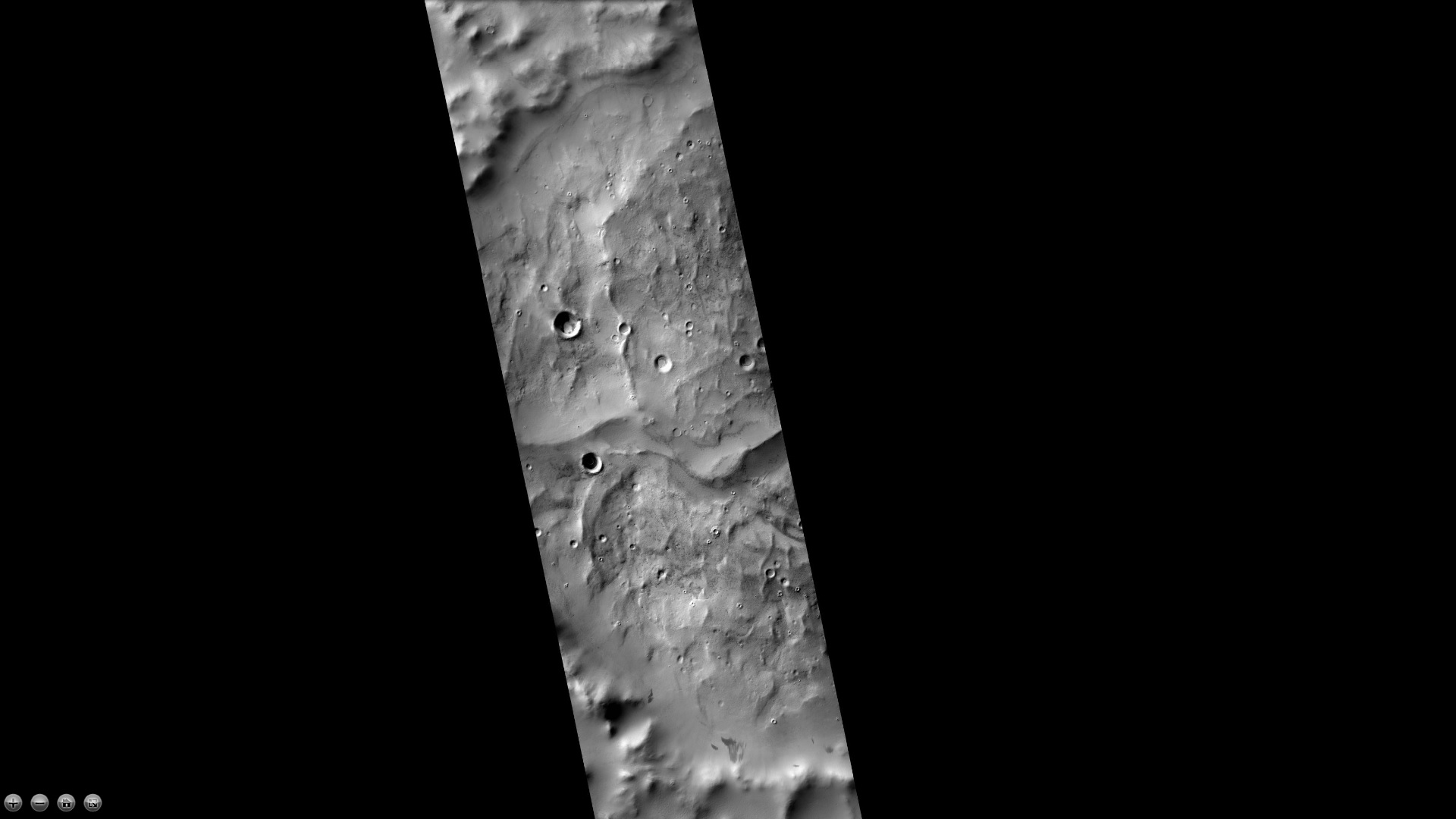
Eskers in Joly crater, as seen by CTX camera (on Mars Reconnaissance Orbiter). Eskers are the ridges in the image; they are formed by streams running under a glacier.

== See also ==
- Climate of Mars
- Geology of Mars
- Geyser (Mars)
- Impact crater
- Impact event
- List of craters on Mars
- Ore resources on Mars
- Planetary nomenclature
