= Jolly Creek =

Watercourse in British Columbia, Canada

Coordinates: 49°07′N 119°07′W

Jolly Creek is a creek located in the Boundary Country region of British Columbia. The creek is south of Conkle Lake. Jolly Creek flows into Rock Creek. It was discovered in 1860 and has been mined for gold. The Creek was named after local prospector Jolly Jack Thornton.
