= André Jolly =

Belgian politician (1799–1883)

André Jolly

Baron André Edourd Jolly (Brussels, 13 April 1799–Brussels, 3 December 1883) was a Belgian engineer, painter, military official and politician.

He was member of the Provisional Government of Belgium (1830). Commandant of the Royal Headquarters, 1831 and Commissaris-General of War.

He was married to Elizabeth Armytage, daughter of George Armytage. Their son Baron Eugène Oscar Jolly was member of the Belgian senate. He was a member of the noble Jolly family.

== Honours ==
- Belgium: Iron Cross.
- Belgium: Grand Cordon in the Order of Leopold.
- France: Knight in the Legion of Honour.
