= Alexandre Gendebien =

Belgian politician (1789–1869)

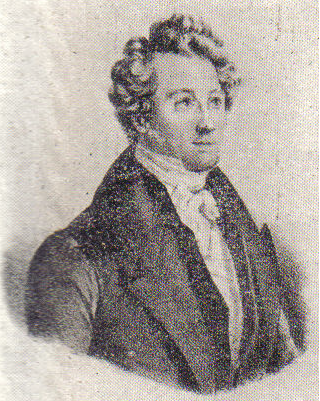
- Alexandre Gendebien

Minister of Justice (Belgium)
- In office 1831–1831
- Preceded by: None
- Succeeded by: Antoine Barthélémy

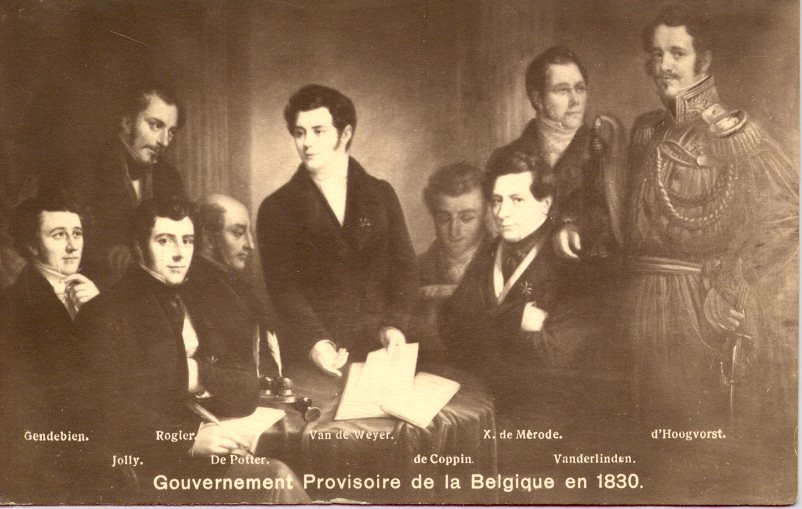
Alexandre Gendebien (leftmost) as member of the Provisional Government of Belgium, 1830

Alexandre Joseph Célestin Gendebien (Mons, 4 May 1789 – Brussels, 6 December 1869) was a lawyer in the United Kingdom of the Netherlands and later Belgium, where he also became minister of Justice.

He played an important role during the Belgian Revolution, together with his colleague Sylvain Van de Weyer. He was a proponent of Belgian union with France, and adversary of William I of the Netherlands.
