= Meeûs d'Argenteuil family =

Belgian noble family

- Country: Spanish Netherlands Austrian Netherlands; French First Republic; First French Empire; United Kingdom of the Netherlands Kingdom of Belgium
- Place of origin: Brussels

The de Meeûs family, formerly Meeûs, is a bourgeois of Brussels family that was ennobled by Leopold I.

== Branches ==
- de Meeûs d'Argenteuil
- de Meeûs d'Argenteuil de Trannoy

== History ==
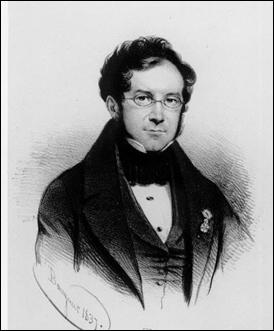
Ferdinand de Meeûs

In 1836 Ferdinand de Meeûs (1798–1861), a scion of a commercial family, was ennobled by the Belgian king Leopold I, with the title of count. Whereas he may have been a family member of Jean-Philippe or Paul Meeûs who were ennobled in 1688, he certainly was not a descendant of one of them. He used the same coat of arms, which was in use within his family, originally prominent members of the corporation of brewers in Brussels.

Ferdinand count Meeûs was a lifelong governor of the Société Générale, founded under the Dutch King William I and becoming a major economic player in the industrial development of the new Belgian kingdom. He built a castle in the 1830s at the edge of the Zoniënwoud. Shortly after it was finished it burned down, and in 1858 a new castle was built at the same spot. In later years, his descendants sold a part of the land to an American businessman, William Hallam Tuck, who had married the Belgian heiress Hilda Bunge. The couple built a residence, 'Argenteuil' or 'château Tuck'. This elegant mansion was sold to the Belgian government in 1949 and was used from 1961 on as the residence of former king Leopold III and his wife Princess Lilian. It was named 'Domaine d'Argenteuil' since.

Most descendants of Ferdinand Meeûs were allowed to add 'd'Argenteuil' to their name (1937–1938). One branch of the family added 'de Trannoy' in supplement (1953).

== Notable members ==
- Ferdinand Meeûs, in 1836 count Ferdinand de Meeûs (1798–1861)
- André count de Meeûs d'Argenteuil (1879–1972), Grandmaster of the House of Queen Elisabeth

== See also ==
- List of noble families in Belgium
- State University of Louvain
- Bourgeois of Brussels
- Guilds of Brussels
- Seven Noble Houses of Brussels
