= Alexandre Joly =

French pyrotechnics businessman and politician

Mayor of Houilles, Yvelines
- In office 1995–2020
- Preceded by: Alain Mahiet

Personal details
- Born: 24 December 1948 (age 77) Villiers-sur-Marne, France
- Party: nonpartisan

Alexandre Joly is a French pyrotechnics businessman and politician born on 24 December 1948 in Villiers-sur-Marne, the Mayor of Houilles from 1995 to 2020 and the vice-president of Yvelines departmental council. In 1972, he was co-creator of the Corrida de Houilles, an international road race held each year between Christmas and New Year's.

== Biography ==
=== Studies ===
Born on December 24, 1948, in Villiers-sur-Marne, Alexandre Joly holds a brevet de technicien supérieur (BTS) technician certificate in business organization.

=== Entrepreneur ===
He created, on May 18, 1981, in Houilles, a company specializing in pyrotechnics and the design and installation of shows, A. Joly Pyrotech Prod Tranis, which was the first in France, according to its creator, to have developed intermittently flaming Bengal lights.

=== Co-founder and commentator of Corrida de Houilles ===
In the early 1970s, he became involved in Houilles' sports activities. With a view to lift running out of the stadiums where it was confined, he co-founded, in 1972, with the local runner André Chauffray, the International Pedestrian Corrida of Houilles (Corrida pédestre internationale de Houilles), an urban foot race whose format, new for the time, became an instant success and was copied in various countries. Not content with being the co-creator of the Houilles Corrida, Joly was also its commentator during its progress as is reported by sports journalist Pierre Fulla in his memoirs. This annual sporting event allowed Joly to forge links with sports personalities, such as Jean-Paul Ollivier or Christian Prudhomme.

=== Mayor ===
In June 1995, he became mayor of this city, winning as a "nonpartisan" candidate in a trilateral election, facing both a right-wing list officially supported by the majority parties RPR and UDF, and a left-wing list.

He has since been re-elected in March 2001, then again on March 11, 2008 (in the first round), and finally on March 30, 2014, in the second round on a "Miscellaneous Right" list, with 66.38% of votes, against 33.61% for Florian Bohème leading the "Union of the Left" list.

The taking of the municipal council by an entrepreneur claiming himself to be nonpartisan, followed by his long-term territorial anchoring, are the result of a sociological evolution of an Île-de-France area located between the towns of Bezons, Sartrouville and Nanterre and belonging historically to the Ceinture rouge (Red Belt) around Paris.

=== Departmental Councillor ===
On March 18, 2001, he was elected General Councillor of Yvelines SE (canton of Houilles-Carrières), prevailing over the outgoing left-wing candidate Nicole Trézières. He was re-elected in 2008 and again in 2014.

He has been vice-president of the General Council of Yvelines since 2009 He is also a member of the Culture-Education-General Affairs Commission. From July 2009 to March 2011, he was 11th vice-president for the elderly, disabled people and medico-social facilities, as well as youth and sports. Since April 2011, he has been 10th vice-president in charge of Youth, Sports, and Outdoor and Recreation Areas.

=== Other responsibilities ===
Alexandre Joly has been vice-president of the Communauté d'agglomération de la Boucle de la seine (CABS) in charge of Roads, Traffic and Transport since 2006 and chairman of the board of directors of the Service Départemental d'Incendie et de Secours (SDIS) for Yvelines, since April 2011.

=== Hosting of Paris-Nice and Tour de France ===
He ensured that his town was selected to host the prologue of the Paris–Nice cycling race in 2013 and as the starting point of the last stage of the Tour de France in 2018.

=== Memorial Policy ===
Since 2004, Alexandre Joly has initiated a memorial policy around Victor Schœlcher, who wrote the decree of 27 April 1848 abolishing slavery in France's colonies and lived and died in Houilles. In his memory, a twinning was created between Houilles and the town of Schœlcher in Martinique. The house where Victor Schœlcher lived was bought by the city in 2011 and is to be converted to a Lieu de Mémoire (site of remembrance).

=== Electoral wrangling ===
In the municipal elections of 1995 and 2001, Alexandre Joly constantly reaffirmed his non-membership of any political party. Thus, in a 2001 press release, he proclaimed his pride of having "achieved a coalition, outside traditional parties and divisions, to straighten out the city and manage it in a new spirit of transparency". To which his opponents of the Plural Left ironically replied: "Well, no party bias, Mr. Joly? No, three party biases! RPR, UDF and DL."

In the 2014 municipal elections, the socialist opposition denounced the lack of transparency of the name "sans étiquette" (nonpartisan) put forward by Alexandre Joly while he had the dual support of the UMP and the UDI. The Socialist candidate, Florian Bohème, also pointed out that in the General Council the mayor voted with the right-wing majority on the issue of cantonal reform. Joly replied that "since his first mandate, the ID common list has consisted of personalities with various sensitivities". He also recalled that out of the six leading candidates of the list in Houilles he was "the only one who had never carried a card."

=== Distinctions ===
Knight of the National Order of Merit.

Holder of the Youth and Sports Silver Medal.

Knight of the Legion of Honor, a distinction conferred on him for his involvement in the Service Départemental d'Incendie et de Secours (SDIS) for Yvelines since 2011.
