= Jolly family =

- Coat of arms of the Jolly family
- Country: Belgium
- Place of origin: London
- Founded: 1799
- Founder: Alexander Jolly
- Titles: Baron, Viscount
- Motto: Recte et fideliter (correctly and faithfully)

Baron André Jolly.

The Jolly family is a Belgian noble family originally from London whose proven male-line parentage dates back to 1799.

== Origins ==
The Jolly family descends from London native Alexander Jolly and Marie-Françoise Moroy. Their son, Hubert, was president of the bar association of Brussels.

== Members ==
- Baron André Jolly (1799–1883), engineer, painter, military official, politician, member of the Provisional Government of Belgium (1830), commander of the Royal Headquarters, and Commissaris-General of War.
- Baron Oscar Jolly [fr] (1824–1902), Major general in the Belgian army.
- Viscount Ferdinand Jolly (1825–1893), lieutenant-general, aide-de-camp to King Léopold II and of Regent Surlet de Chokier.
- Viscount Hubert Jolly [fr] (1871–1940), lieutenant-general, aide-de-camp to Kings Albert I and Leopold III

== Heraldry ==
Coat of arms of Jolly family
Description Argent, a cross engrailed Sable, on a chief Or three cinquefoils Gules, overall a canton tierced per pale Gules, Or, and Sable. Crest A lion issuant Or Supporters Two griffins Or Motto « Recte et fideliter »
