= Provisional Government of Belgium =

Government from September to November 1830

Belgium Voorlopig Bewind (Dutch) Gouvernement provisoire (French)
- 1830–1831
- Flag

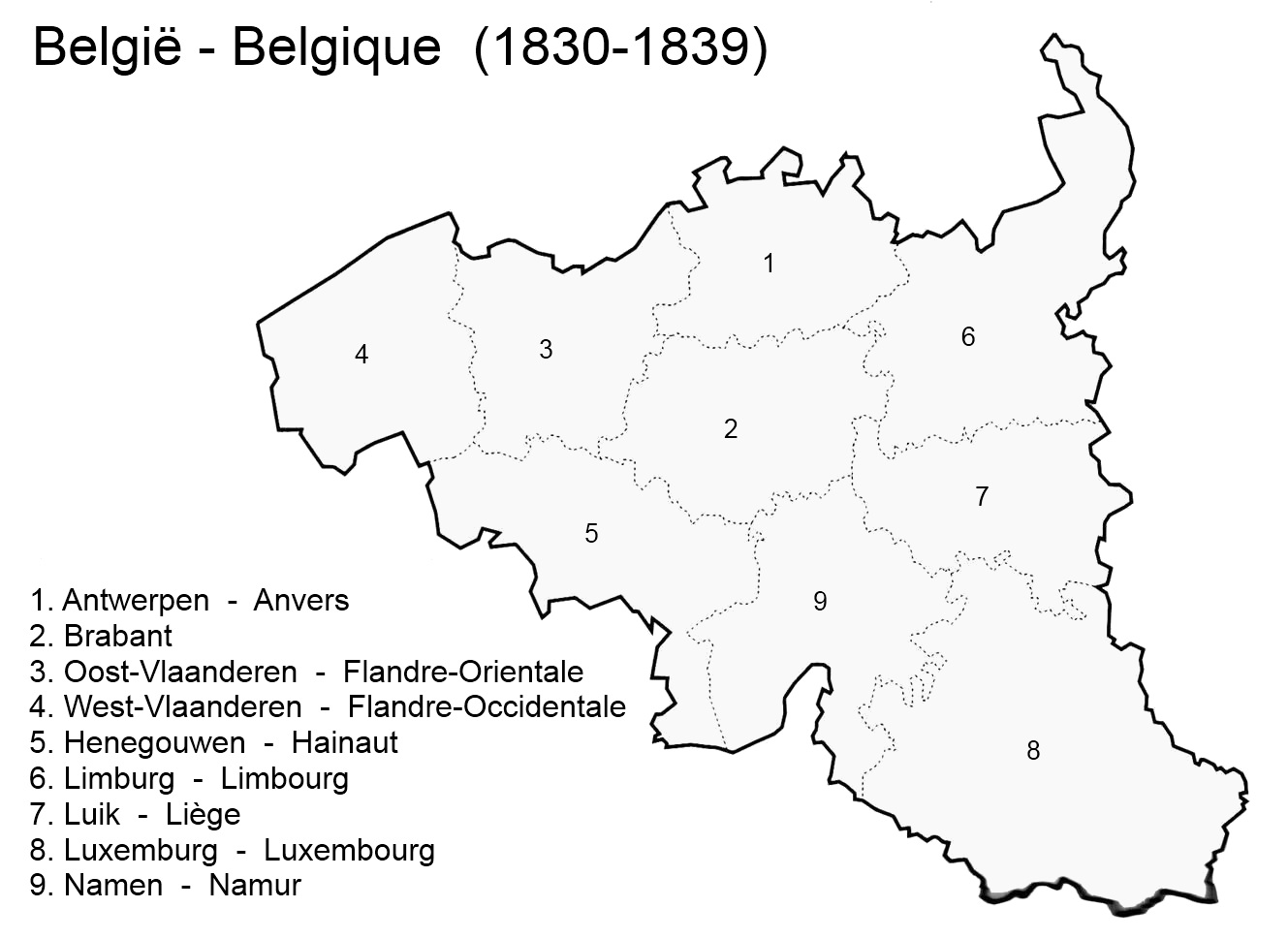
- Belgium before the Treaty of London (1839).
- Capital: Brussels
- Government: Provisional government
- Chairman
  - 1830–1831: Charles Rogier
- Legislature: National Congress
- Historical era: Late modern period
  - Formation: 27 September 1830
  - Proclamation of Belgian Constitution: 25 February 1831
Preceded by	Succeeded by
United Kingdom of the Netherlands	Belgium

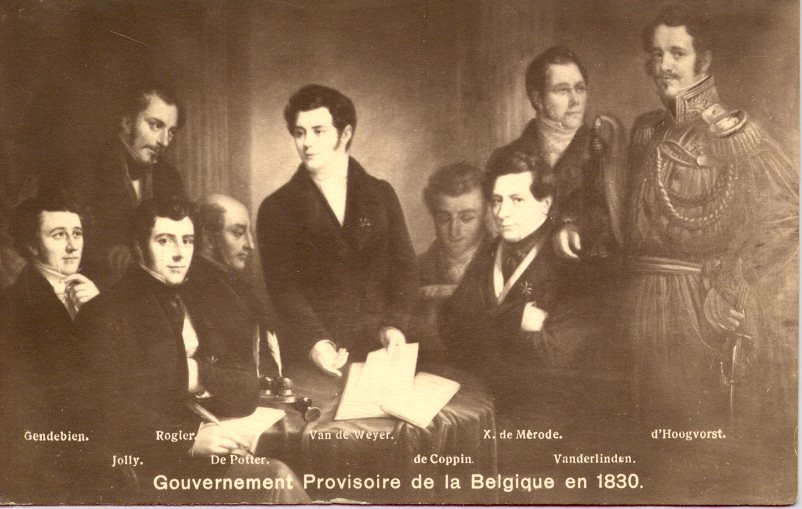
Members of the provisional government, from left to right: Gendebien, Jolly, Rogier, de Potter, Van de Weyer, de Coppin de Falaën, de Mérode, Van der Linden, van der Linden d'Hooghvorst.

The Provisional Government (Dutch: Voorlopig Bewind; French: Gouvernement provisoire) was the first iteration of the Belgian state, formed in the midst of the Belgian Revolution. After Dutch forces were expelled from Brussels on 27 September 1830, the recently created Revolutionary Committee transformed into the Provisional Government. The independence of Belgium as a state was officially declared on 4 October.

On 7 February 1831, the Constitution of Belgium was proclaimed and Erasme Louis Surlet de Chokier was declared regent. With Belgium now under a constitutional monarchy, the Provisional Government was dissolved.

== History ==
As the Belgian Revolution raged in Brussels, William I of the Netherlands attempted to forcefully end the revolt. An army under William's son, Prince Frederick, occupied the city on 23 September. A Revolutionary Committee was formed by the Belgians to organize a revolt against the occupying force, and the Dutch began their retreat on the 26th.

On 27 September the Revolutionary Committee assumed the title of Provisional Government, and two days later on 28 September it set up a Central Committee. This Central Committee proclaimed the independence of the "provinces of Belgium" on 4 October 1830. Afterwards, the term Provisional Government was increasingly used to refer to the Central Committee. Apart from the Central Committee, there also were Special Committees for War, Internal Affairs, Finance, Justice, Public Safety, and Diplomacy; each of these had distinct ramifications for the history of Belgium.

The Provisional Government exercised both executive and legislative power until 10 November 1830, when the National Congress met for the first time. On 12 November it formally returned its powers to the National Congress, which subsequently decided to entrust executive power to the Provisional Government. It was dissolved on 25 February 1831 after Erasme, Baron Surlet de Chokier was appointed Regent by the National Congress, beginning the modern Kingdom of Belgium.

== Members of the Provisional Government ==
- Charles Rogier (chairman, member from 25 September 1830–25 February 1831)
- Emmanuel, Baron van der Linden d'Hooghvorst (member from 24 September–12 November 1830)
- Félix, Count de Mérode (member from 26 September 1830–25 February 1831)
- Alexandre Gendebien (member from 26 September 1830–25 February 1831)
- Sylvain Van de Weyer (member from 26 September 1830–25 February 1831)
- André-Edouard Jolly (member from 24 September 1830–25 February 1831)
- Feuillen, Baron de Coppin de Falaën (member from 24 September 1830–25 February 1831)
- Joseph Van der Linden (member from 24 September 1830–25 February 1831)
- Louis de Potter (member from 28 September–13 November 1830)
- Jean Nicolay (member from 25 September–10 October 1830)

== See also ==
- Belgian Revolution
- History of Belgium
- Provisional government
