= Leo Jolley =

Leo Jolley (19 Aug 1920, Preston – 25 Dec 1976, Great Missenden) was an English information scientist who chaired the Co‐ordinate Indexing Group of the Association of Specialist Libraries and Information Bureaux in the 1960s. In 1977 Jolley was described by Keith Albarn and Jennifer Miall Smith as being one of the foremost thinkers in the area of data handling shortly after his death. They highlighted this through his conception of the holotheme as a demonstrable form of an inherent structure present in all knowledge.

Jolley was born John Lionel Jolley on 19 Aug 1920 in Grove House Nursing Home, Preston, Lancashire. His father was John Ernest Jolley and his mother Ethel Birch. He married Jessie Marian Holman. They had 4 children, a son and 3 daughters the eldest of whom died in childhood.

== The Fabric of Knowledge (1976) ==
The Foreword was provided by Clive W. Kilmister, Professor of Mathematics, at King's College London. Kilmister praises Jolley for an approach centred on the social sciences, economics, politics and management. He then remarks: "The order and system that Mr. Jolley brings to the modern world of mathematics (specially algebra and analysis) is quite striking. It would not be true to say that there was previously chaus here, but the most avowedly systematic account, say by the Bourbaki school is of an unsatisfactory basis." (Nicolas Bourbaki was a multiple-use name used by a group of predominantly French mathematicians beginning in the 1930s.) "A starting point for Bouraki is what is known as a set, a collection of things of any sort whatever."

== Works ==
Much of his work appeared in Aslib Proceedings:

- (1963) "The Mechanics of Coordinate Indexing and its relation to other Indexing Methods" Vol. 15 No. 6, pp. 161-169.
- (1967) "The Logic of Coordinate Indexing" Vol. 19 No. 9, pp. 295-309

Books:

- (1968) Data Study, London
- (1973) The Fabric of Knowledge, London: Duckworth
