= Cone (botany) =

Reproductive organ on conifers

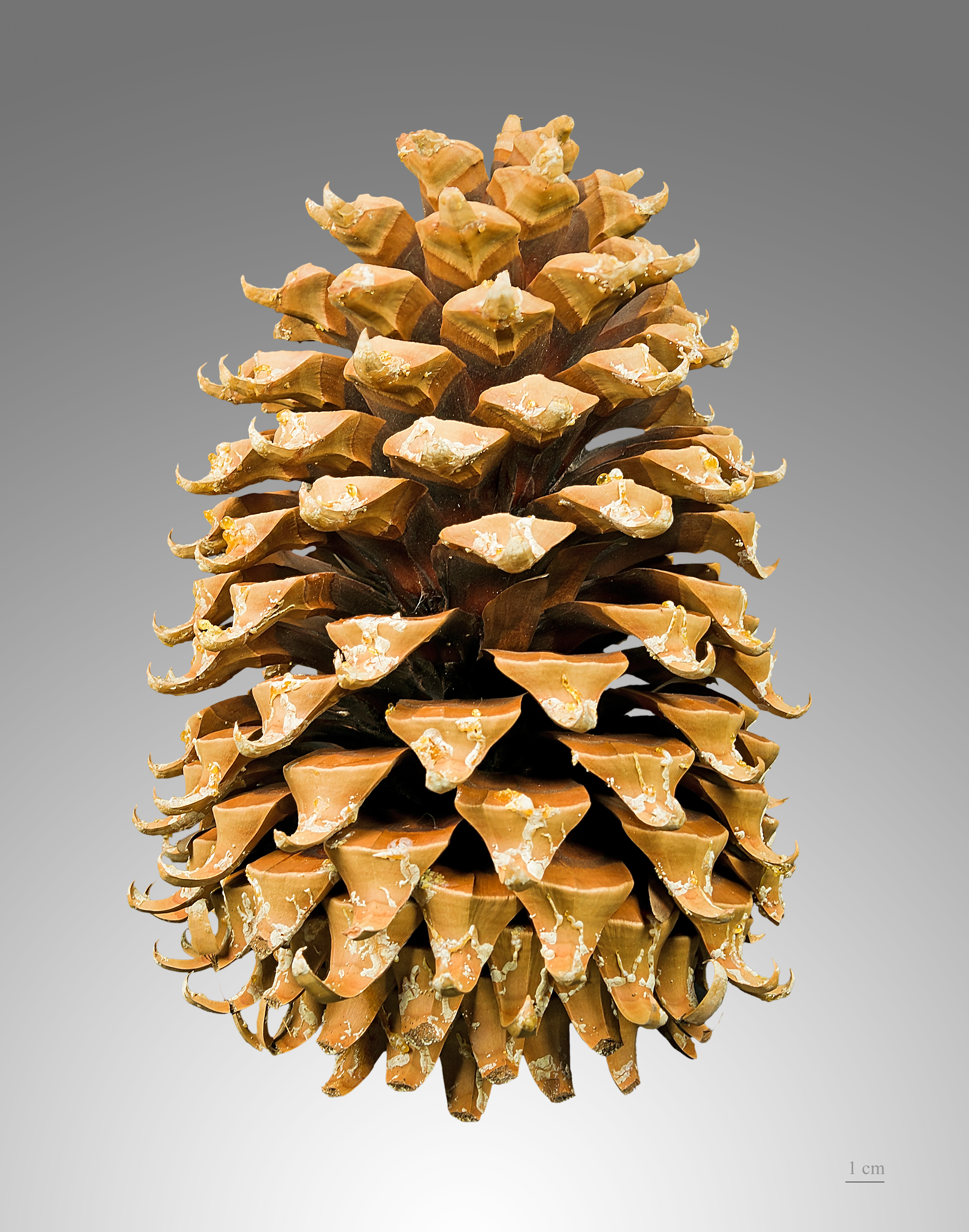
A mature female big-cone pine (Pinus coulteri) cone, the heaviest pine cone

A cone, or in formal botanical usage a strobilus, pl.: strobili, is a seed-bearing organ on gymnosperm plants, especially in conifers and cycads. They are usually woody and variously conic, cylindrical, ovoid, to globular, and have scales and bracts arranged around a central axis, but can be fleshy and berry-like. The cones of Pinophyta (conifer clade) contain the reproductive structures. The woody cone is the female cone, which produces seeds. The male cone, which produces pollen, is usually ephemeral and much less conspicuous even at full maturity. The name 'cone' derives from Greek konos (pine cone), which also gave name to the geometric cone. The individual plates of a cone are known as scales. In conifers where the cone develops over more than one year (such as pines), the first year's growth of a seed scale on the cone, showing up as a protuberance at the end of the two-year-old scale, is called an umbo, while the second year's growth is called the apophysis.

The male cone (microstrobilus or pollen cone) is structurally similar across all conifers, differing only in small ways (mostly in scale arrangement) from species to species. Extending out from a central axis are microsporophylls (modified leaves). Under each microsporophyll is one or several microsporangia (pollen sacs).

The female cone (megastrobilus, seed cone, or ovulate cone) contains ovules which when fertilized by pollen become seeds. The female cone structure varies more markedly between the different conifer families and is often crucial for the identification of many species of conifers.

== Cones by family ==
=== Pinaceae ===
Members of the pine family have cones that are imbricate (that is, with scales overlapping each other like fish scales). These cones, especially the woody female cones, are considered the "archetypal" tree cones. The female cone has two types of scale: bract scale and seed scale (or ovuliferous scale), one subtended by each bract scale, derived from a highly modified branchlet. On the upper-side base of each seed scale are two ovules that develop into seeds after fertilization by pollen grains. The bract scales develop first and are conspicuous at the time of pollination; the seed scales develop later to enclose and protect the seeds, with the bract scales often not growing further. The scales open temporarily to receive pollen, then close during fertilization and maturation, and re-open at maturity to allow the seed to escape. Maturation takes 6–8 months from pollination in most Pinaceae genera, but 12 months in cedars and 18–24 months (rarely more) in most pines. The cones open either by the seed scales flexing back when they dry out, or (in firs, cedars and golden larch) by the cones disintegrating with the seed scales falling off. The cones are conic, cylindrical or ovoid (egg-shaped), and small to very large, from 2–60 cm long and 1–20 cm broad.

After ripening, the opening of non-serotinous pine cones is associated with their moisture content—cones are open when dry and closed when wet. This assures that the small, windborne seeds will be dispersed during relatively dry weather, and thus the distance traveled from the parent tree will be enhanced. A pine cone goes through many cycles of opening and closing during its life span.

Anatomy of a Scots pine (Pinus sylvestris) female strobilus.

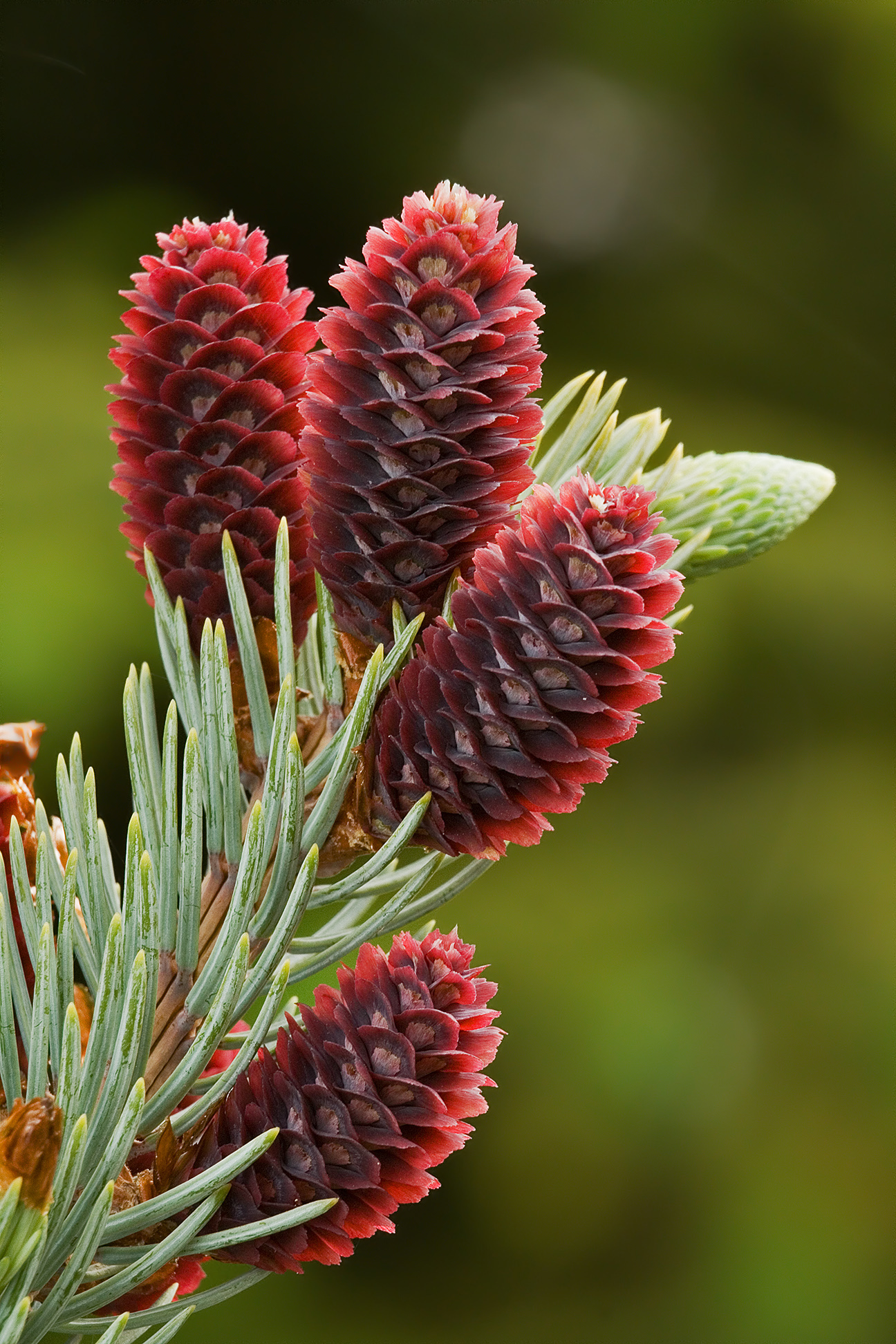
Young cones of a blue spruce (Picea pungens)

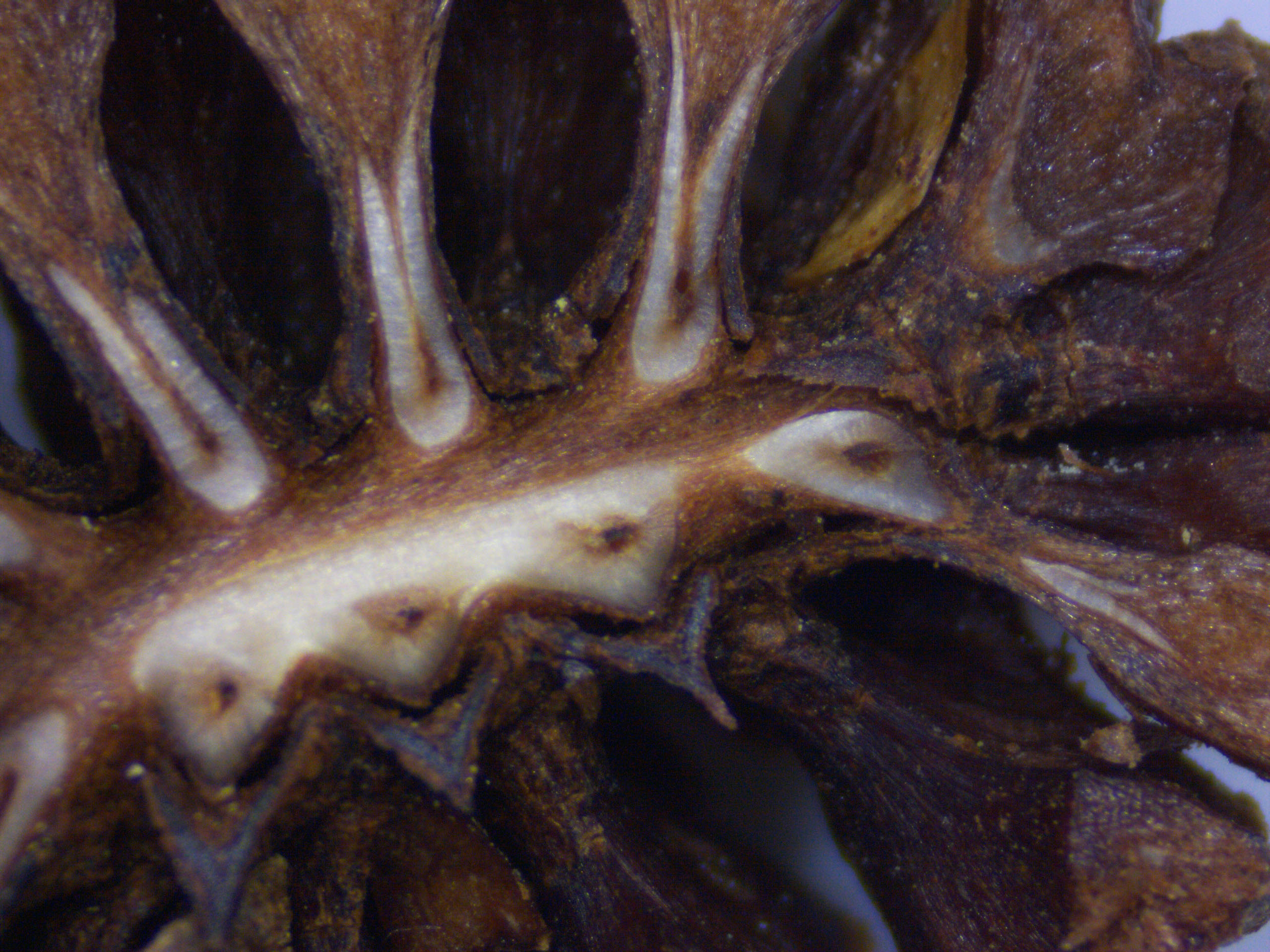
Cross-section of a young female cone

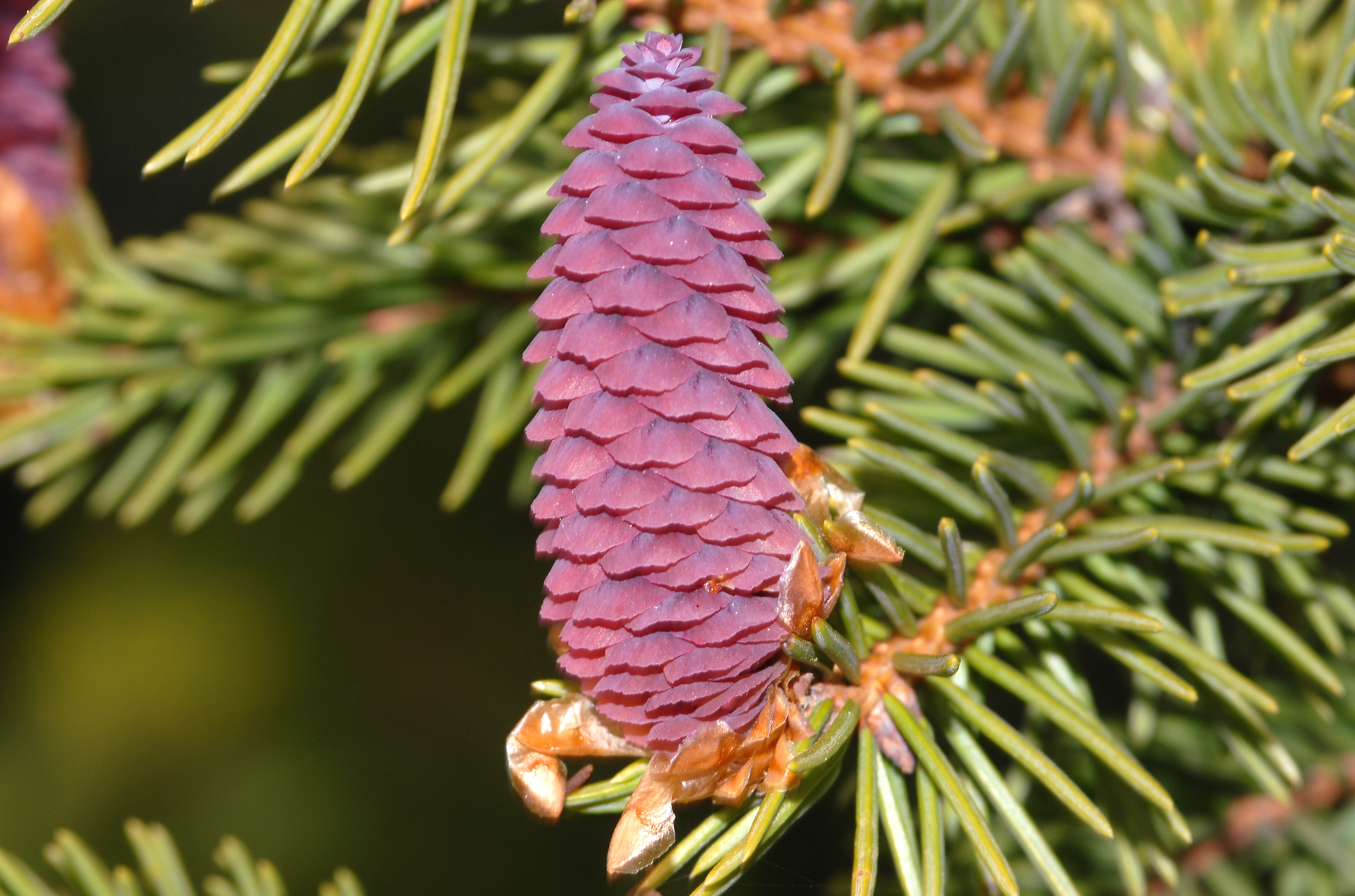
Young female cone on a Norway spruce (Picea abies)

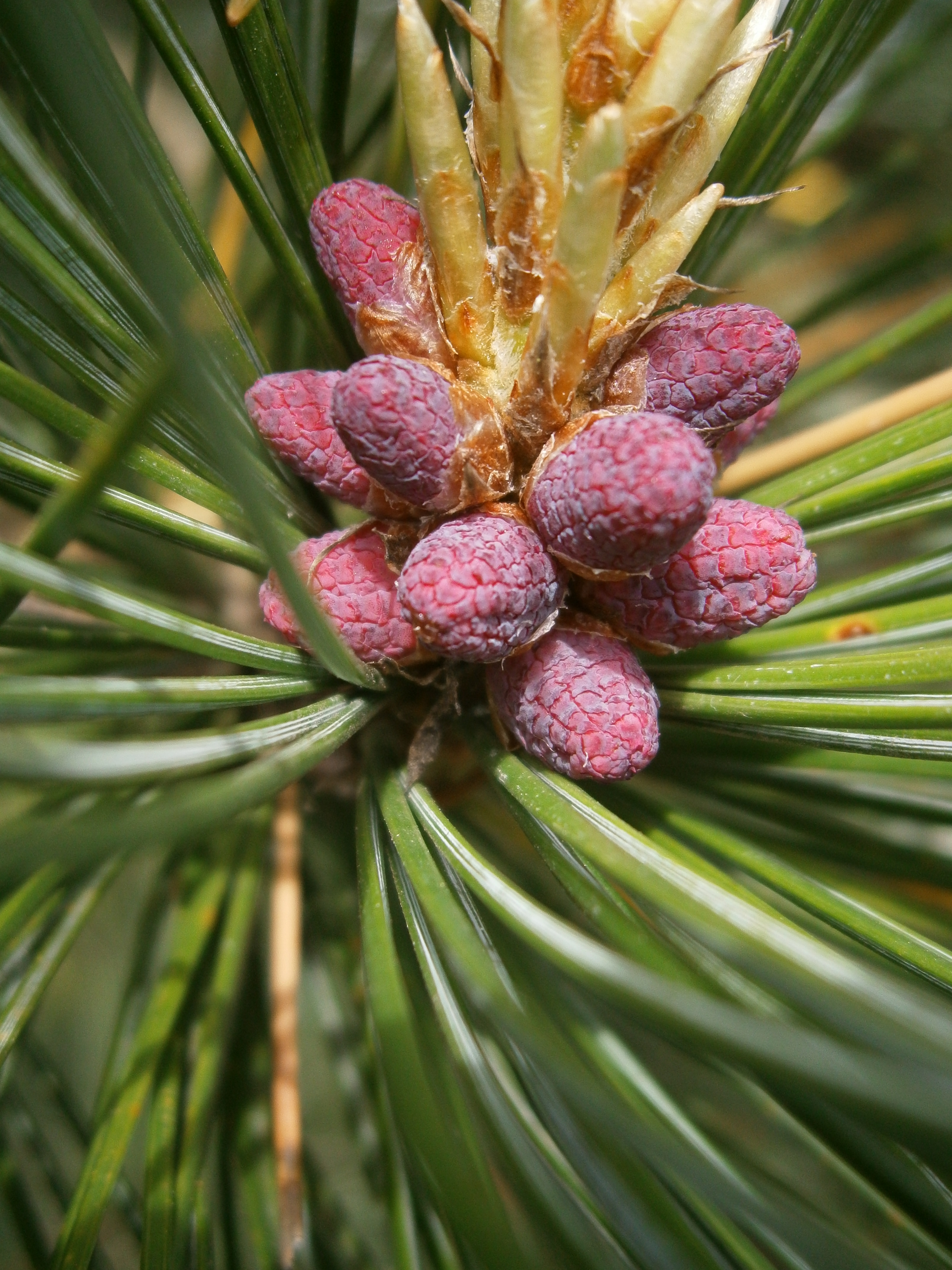
Immature male cones of Swiss pine (Pinus cembra)

=== Araucariaceae ===
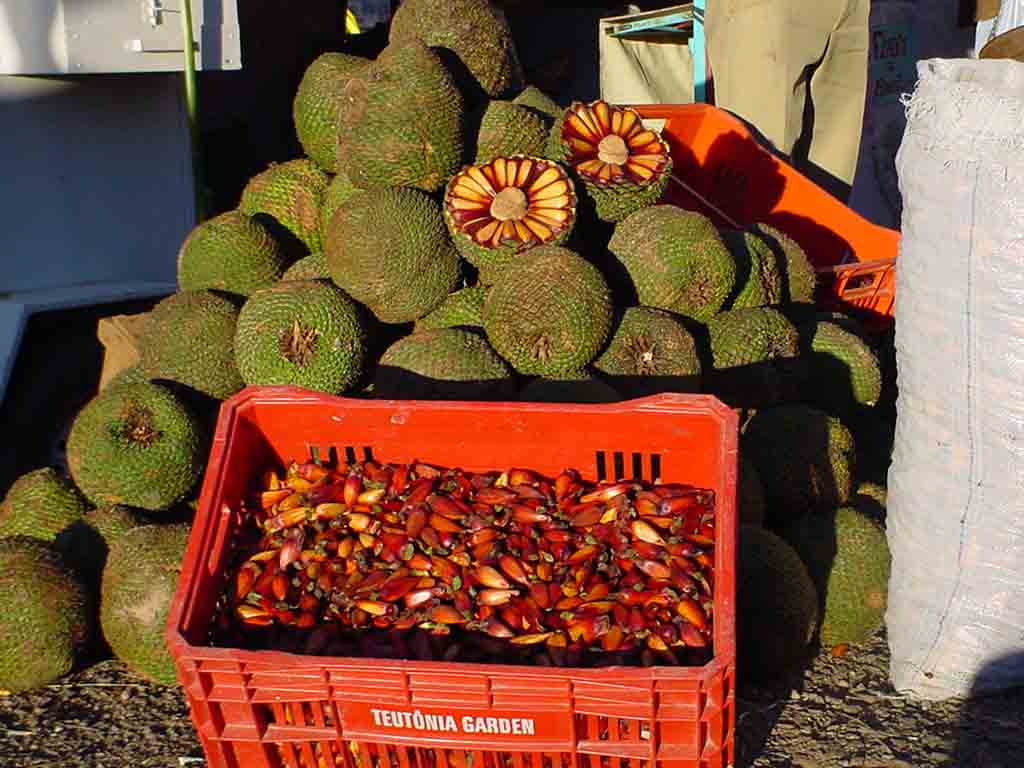
Araucaria angustifolia cones and nuts

Members of the Araucariaceae (Araucaria, Agathis, Wollemia) have the bract and seed scales fully fused and have only one ovule on each scale. The cones are spherical or nearly so, 5–30 cm diameter, and mature in 18 months. For most species they disintegrate at maturity to release the seeds, although in some such as Araucaria bidwillii, the cone weighing up to 10 kilograms (22 lb) is shed intact. In Agathis, the seeds are winged and separate readily from the seed scale, but in the other two genera, the seed is wingless and fused to the scale.

=== Podocarpaceae ===
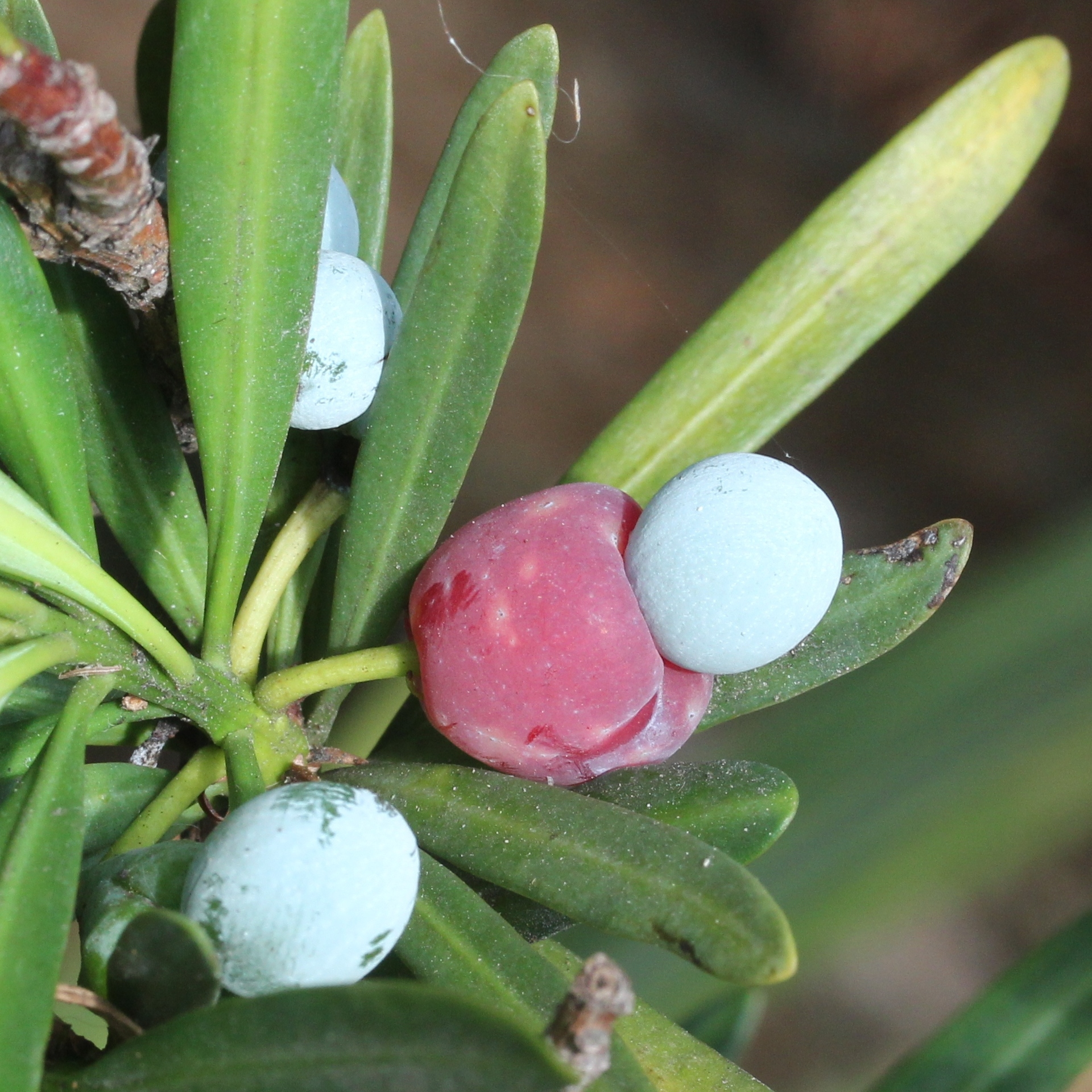
Berry-like Podocarpus cone, an aril

The cones of the Podocarpaceae are similar in function, though not in development, to those of the Taxaceae (q.v. below), being berry-like with the scales highly modified, evolved to attract birds into dispersing the seeds. In most of the genera, two to ten or more scales are fused together into a usually swollen, brightly coloured, soft, edible fleshy aril. Usually, only one or two scales at the apex of the cone are fertile, each bearing a single wingless seed, but in Saxegothaea several scales may be fertile. The fleshy scale complex is 0.5–3 cm long, and the seeds 4–10 mm long. In some genera (e.g. Prumnopitys), the scales are minute and not fleshy, but the seed coat develops a fleshy layer instead, the cone having the appearance of one to three small plums on a central stem. The seeds have a hard coat evolved to resist digestion in the bird's stomach.

=== Cupressaceae ===
Members of the cypress family (cypresses, arborvitae, junipers, redwoods, etc.) differ in that the bract and seed scales are fully fused, with the bract visible as no more than a small lump or spine on the scale. The botanical term galbulus (plural galbuli; from the Latin for a cypress cone) is sometimes used instead of strobilus for members of this family. The female cones have one to 20 ovules on each scale. They often have peltate scales, as opposed to the imbricate cones described above, though some have imbricate scales. The cones are usually small, 0.3–6 cm or 1/8–2 3/8 inches long, and often spherical or nearly so, like those of Nootka cypress, while others, such as western redcedar and California incense-cedar, are narrow. The scales are arranged either spirally, or in decussate whorls of two (opposite pairs) or three, rarely four. The genera with spiral scale arrangement were often treated in a separate family (Taxodiaceae) in the past. In most of the genera, the cones are woody and the seeds have two narrow wings (one along each side of the seed), but in three genera (Platycladus, Microbiota and Juniperus), the seeds are wingless, and in Juniperus, the cones are fleshy and berry-like (known as galbuli).

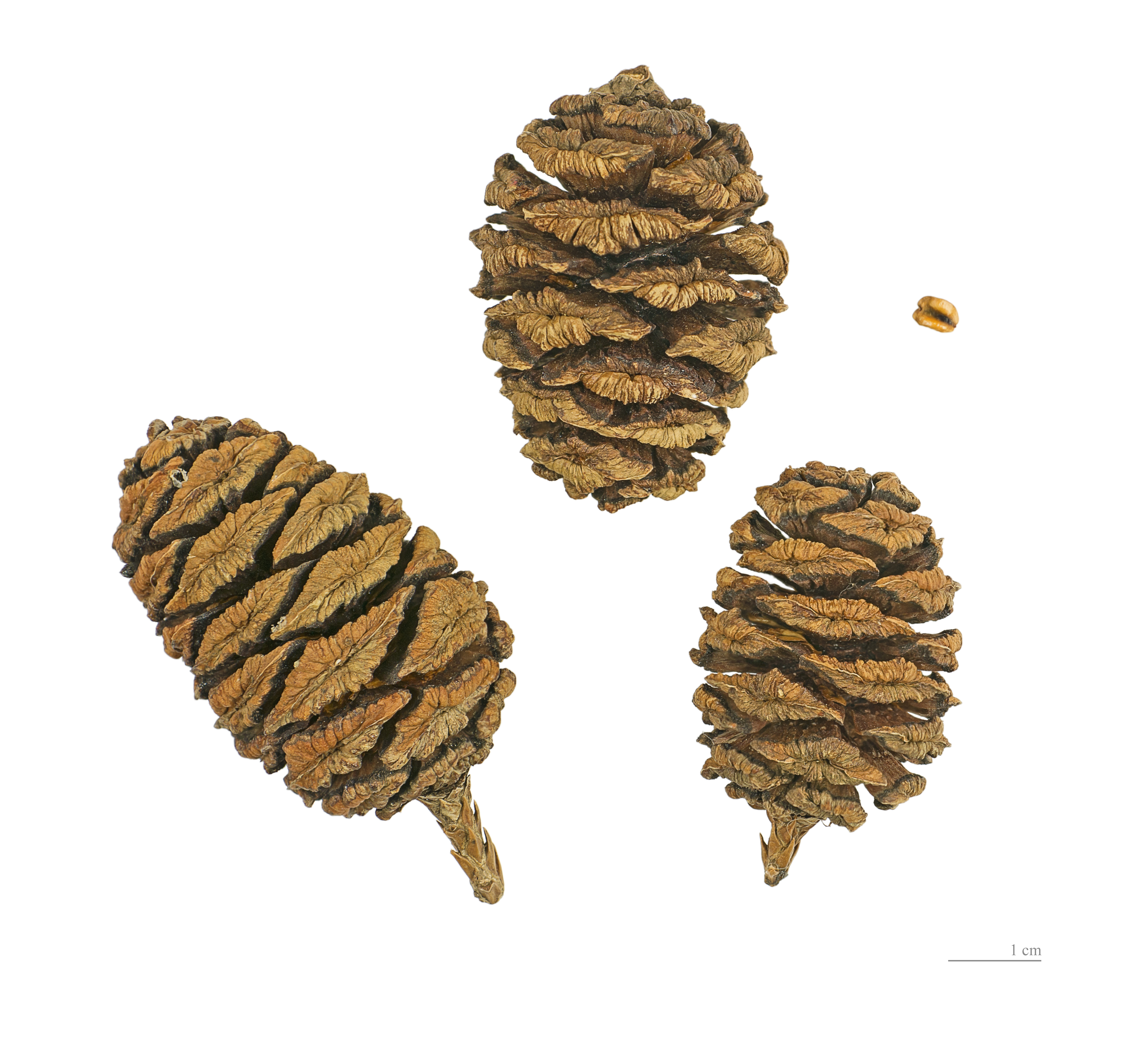
Giant sequoia cones

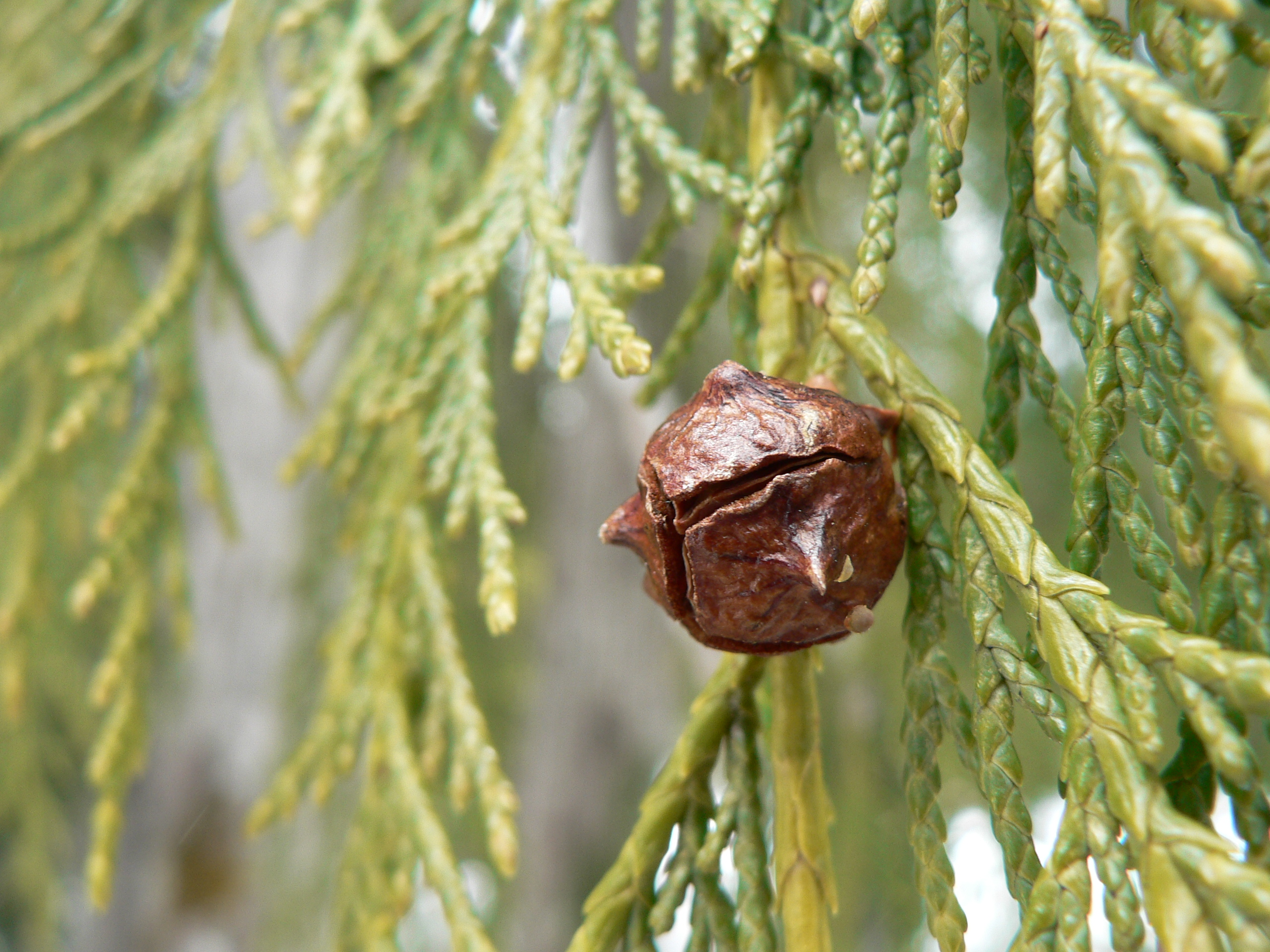
Spherical cone of Nootka cypress (Cupressus nootkatensis)

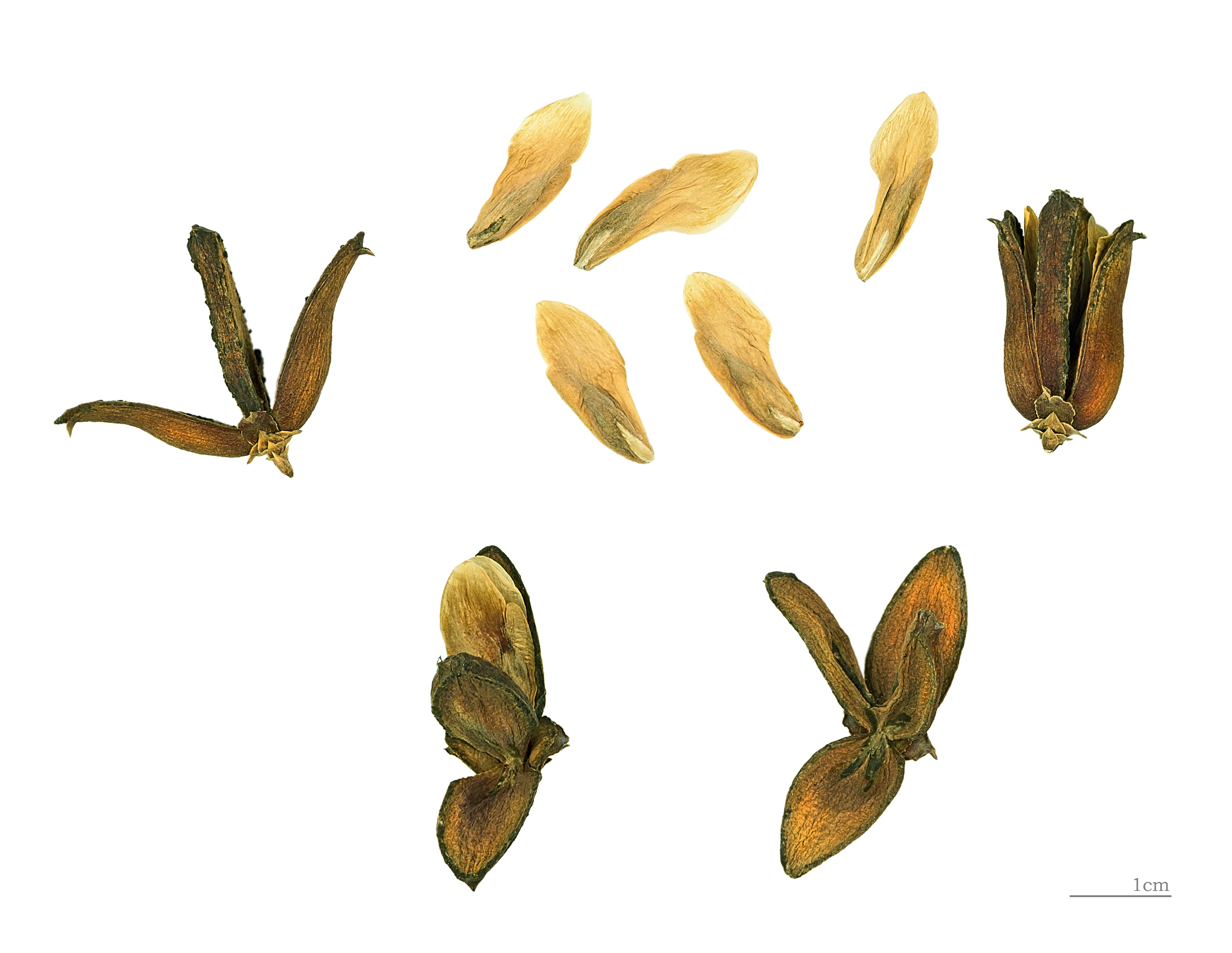
Long slender cones and winged seeds of California incense-cedar (Calocedrus decurrens)

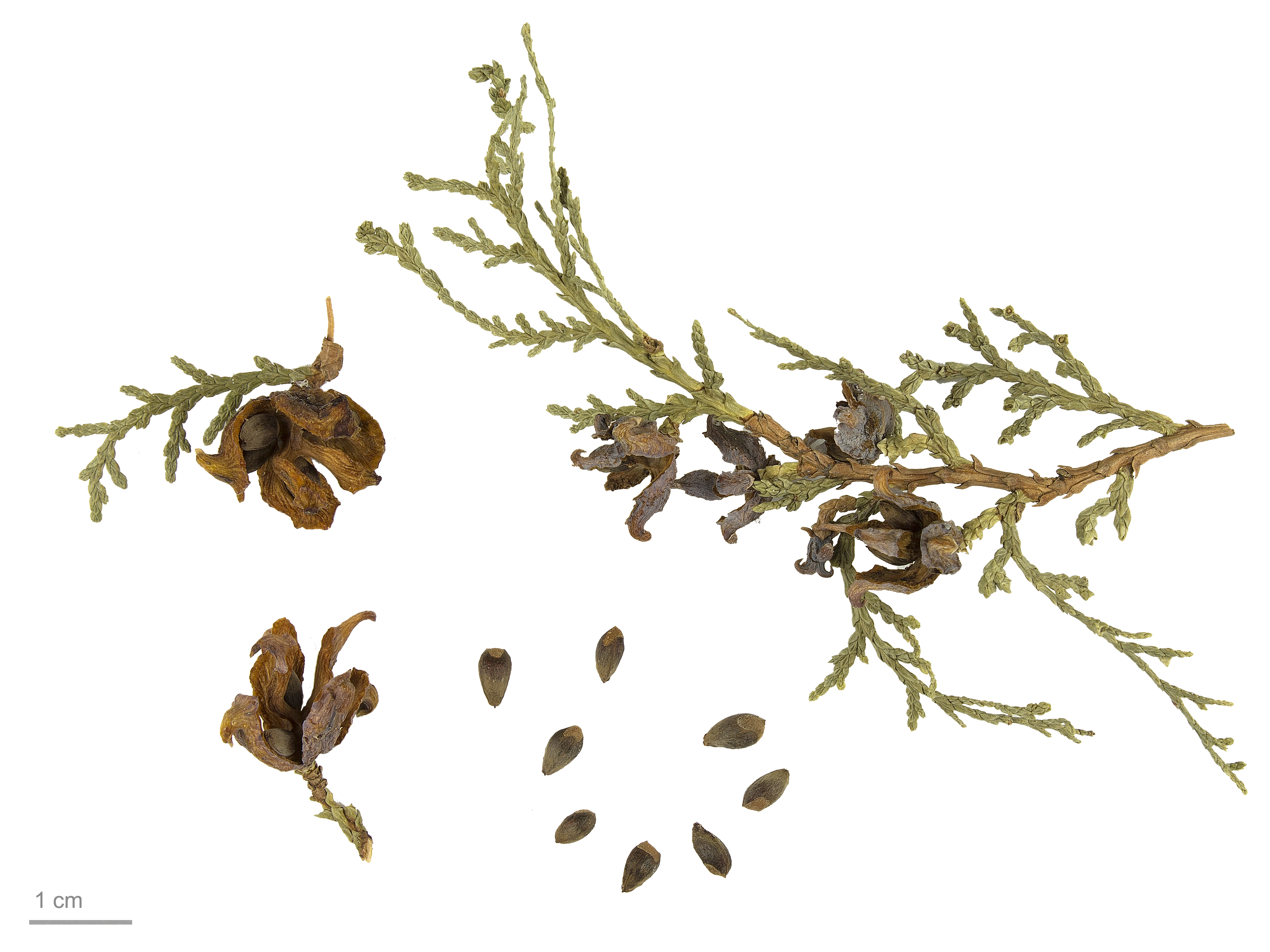
Cones and wingless seeds of Chinese arborvitae (Platycladus orientalis)

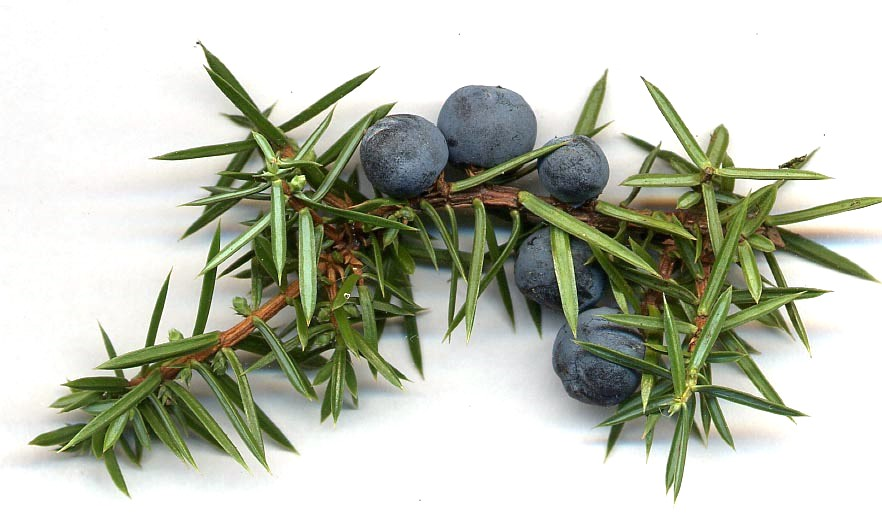
Berry-like cones of common juniper (Juniperus communis)

=== Sciadopityaceae ===
The cones and seeds of Sciadopitys (the only member of the family) are similar to those of some Cupressaceae, but larger, 6–11 cm long; the scales are imbricate and spirally arranged, and have 5–9 ovules on each scale.

=== Taxaceae and Cephalotaxaceae ===
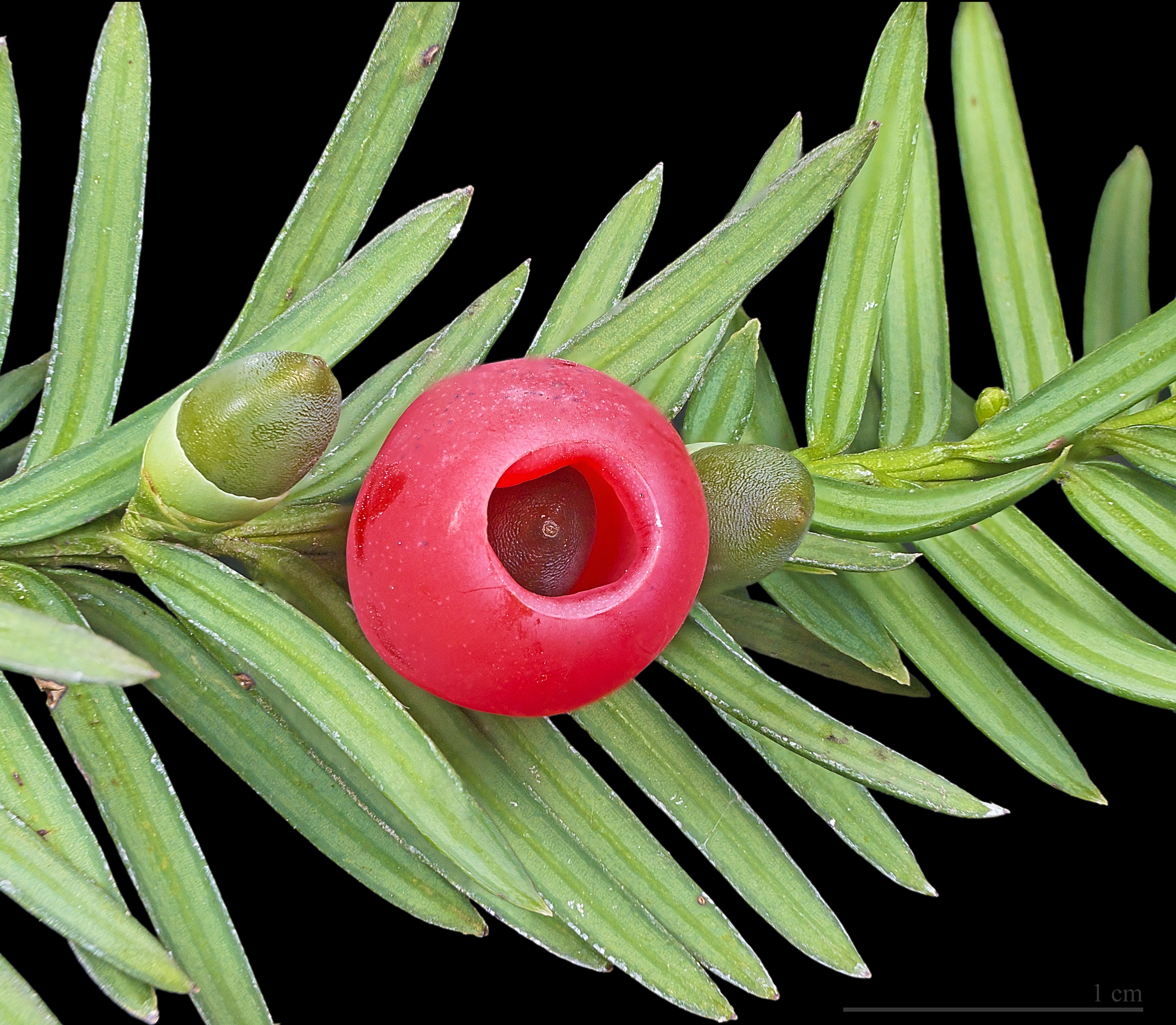
Berry-like yew cone, an aril

Members of the yew family and the closely related Cephalotaxaceae have the most highly modified cones of any conifer. There is only one scale in the female cone, with a single poisonous ovule. The scale develops into a soft, brightly coloured sweet, juicy, berry-like aril which partly encloses the deadly seed. The seed alone is poisonous. The whole 'berry' with the seed is eaten by birds, which digest the sugar-rich scale and pass the hard seed undamaged in their droppings, so dispersing the seed far from the parent plant.

=== Welwitschiaceae ===
Welwitschia is unique cone-bearing plant is not considered a conifer but belongs in the order Welwitschiales. Welwitschia mirabilis is often called a living fossil and is the only species in its genus, which is the only genus in its family, which is the only family in its order. The male cones are on male plants, and female cones on female plants. After emergence of the two cotyledons, it sets only two more leaves. Those two leaves then continue to grow longer from their base. This allows it great drought tolerance, which is likely why it has survived in the desert of Namibia, while all other representatives from its order are extinct.

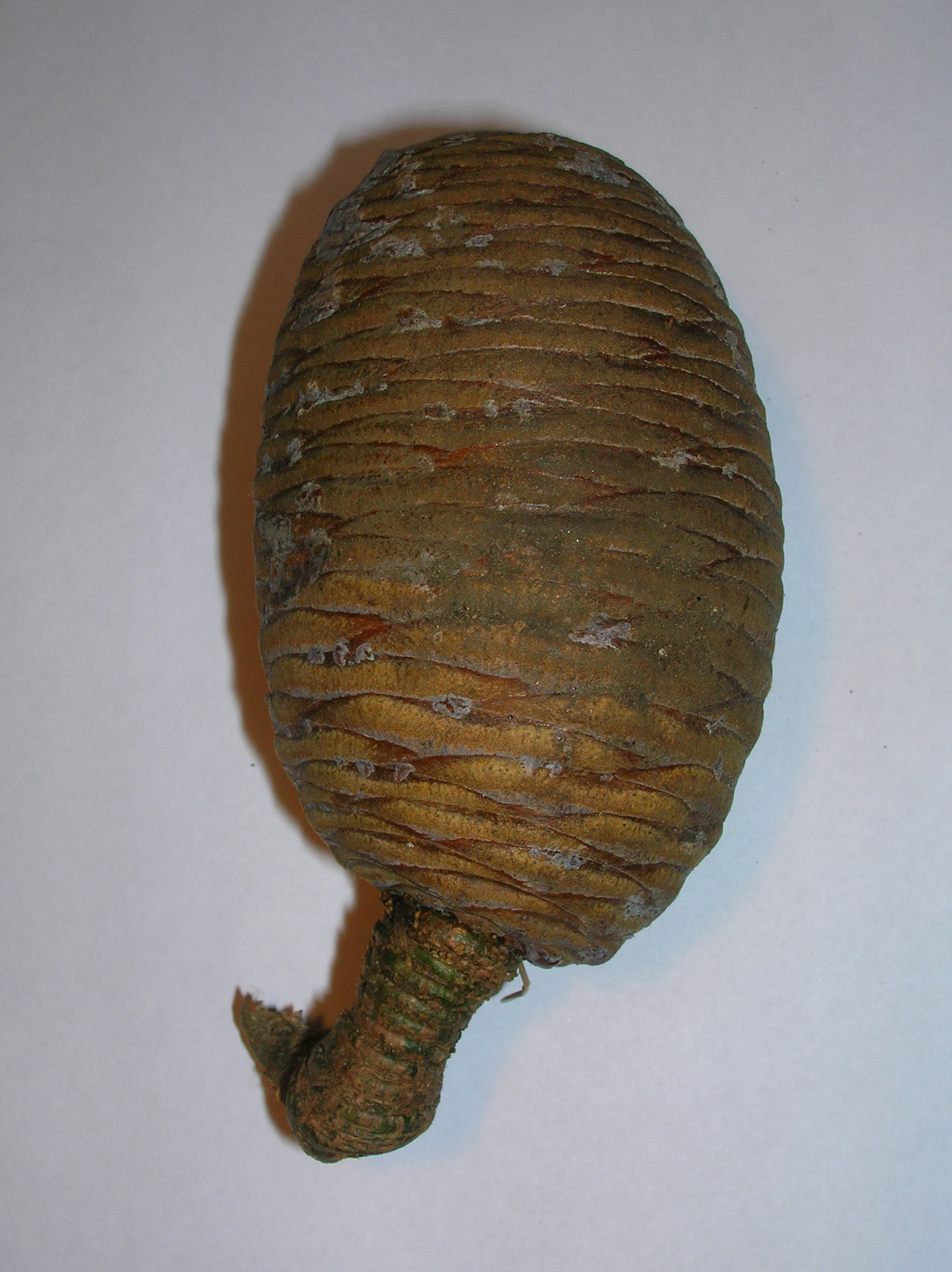
Female cone of a Lebanese cedar

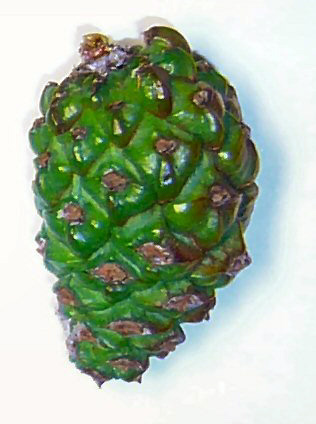
Immature female pine cone

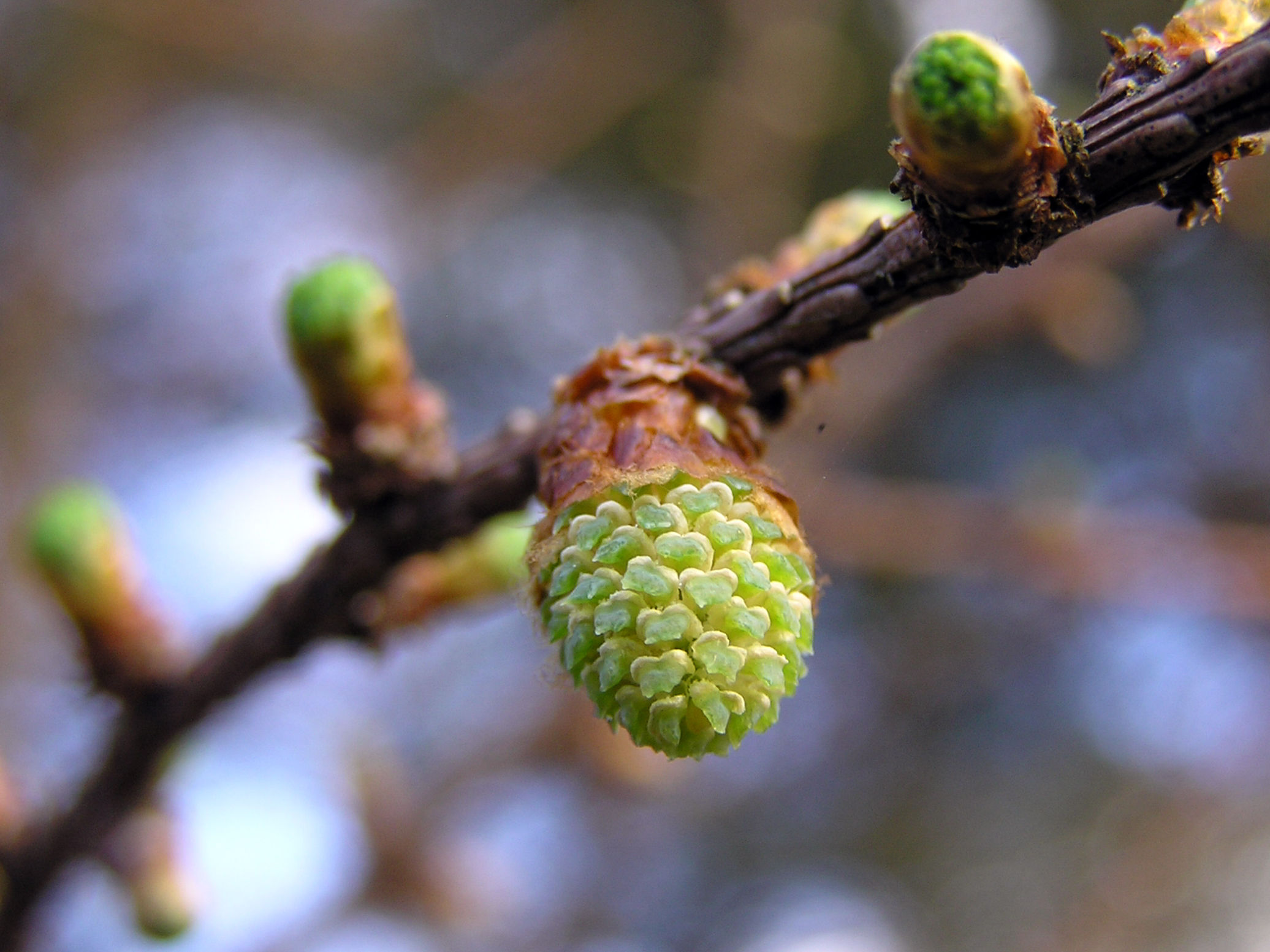
Pollen cone of a Japanese larch

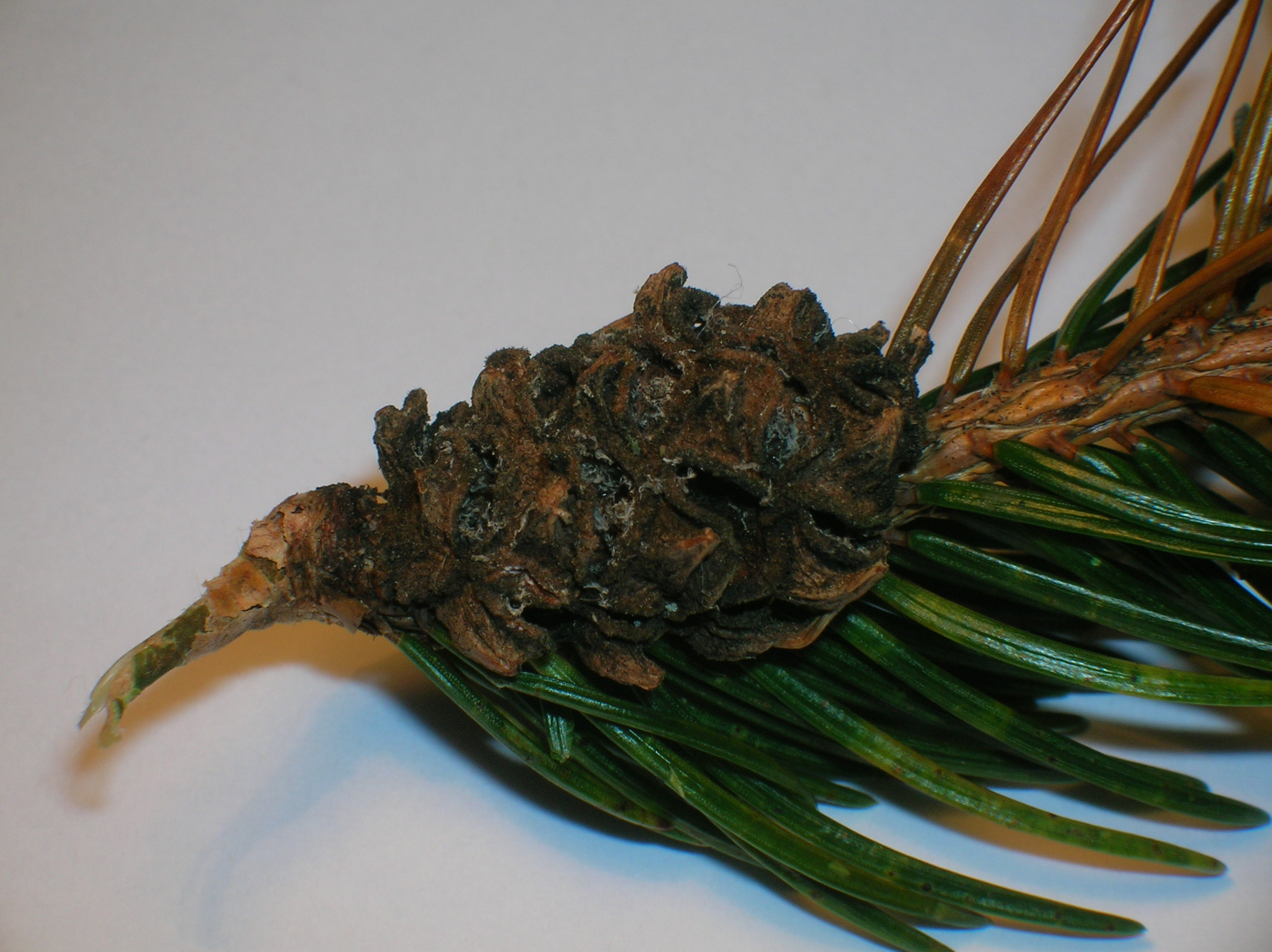
Pineapple gall on Sitka spruce caused by Adelges abietis

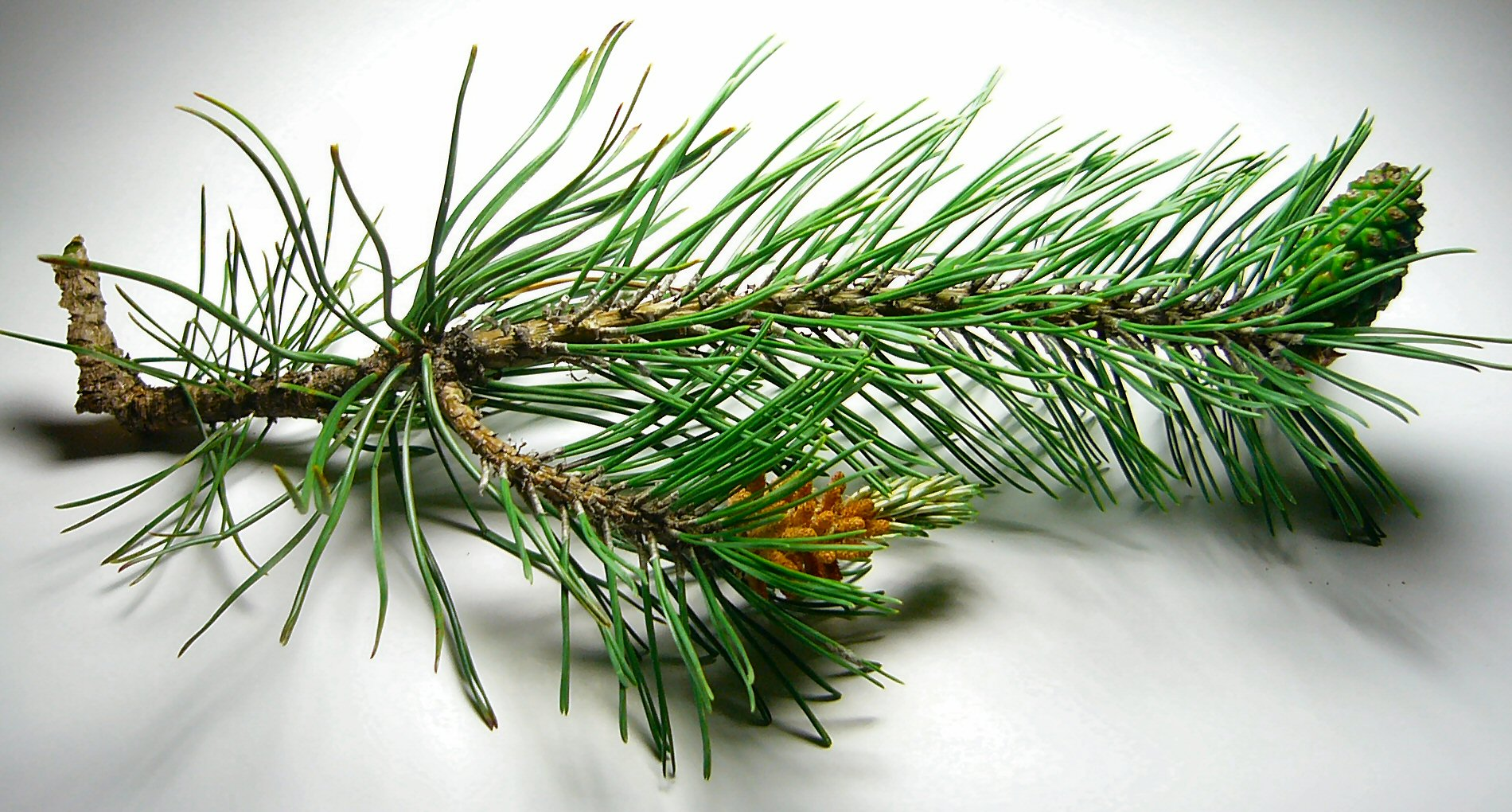
Dozens of male cones (orange and flower-like) occur in a cluster; the female cone is still immature (olive green). Lodgepole pine.

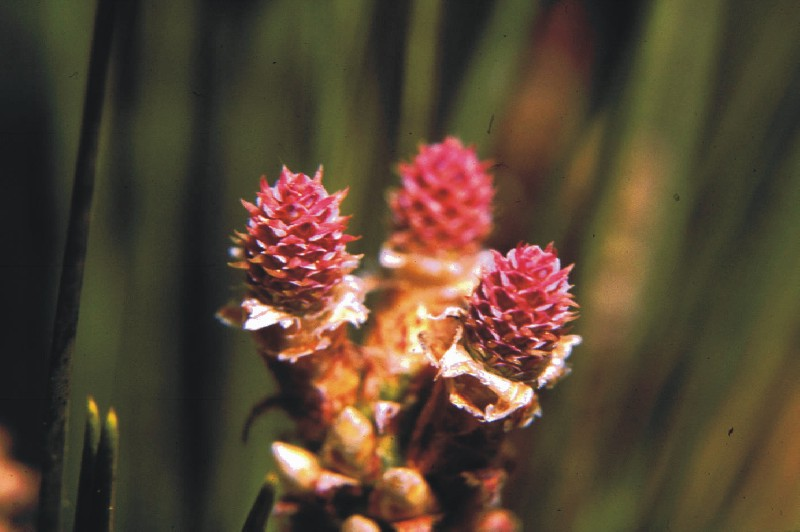
Young female cones of loblolly pine receptive for pollination

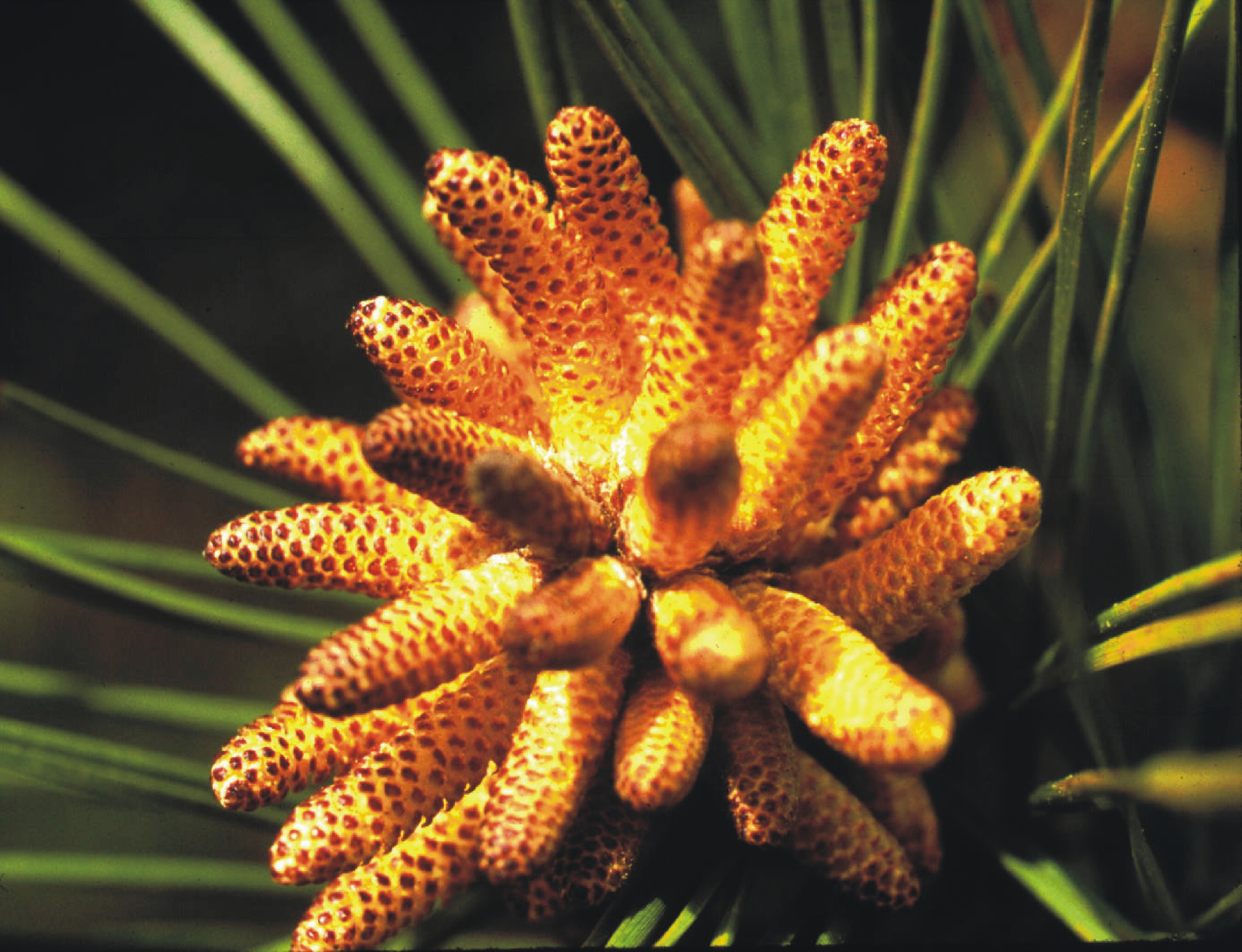
Loblolly pine male cones ready to cast pollen

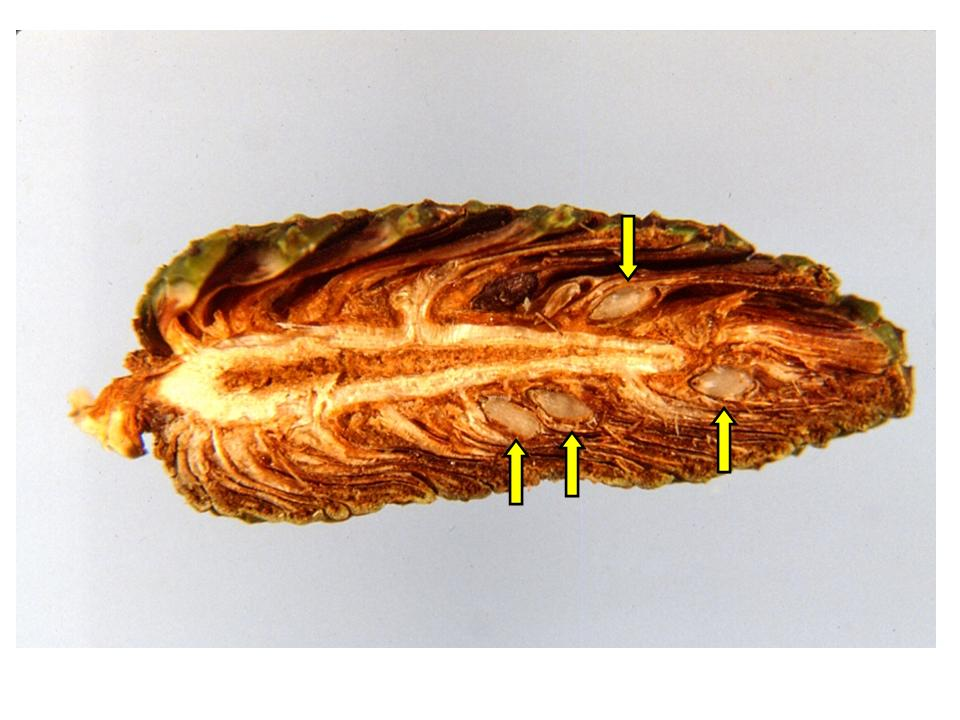
Cross section of maturing shortleaf pine cone showing seeds (arrows)

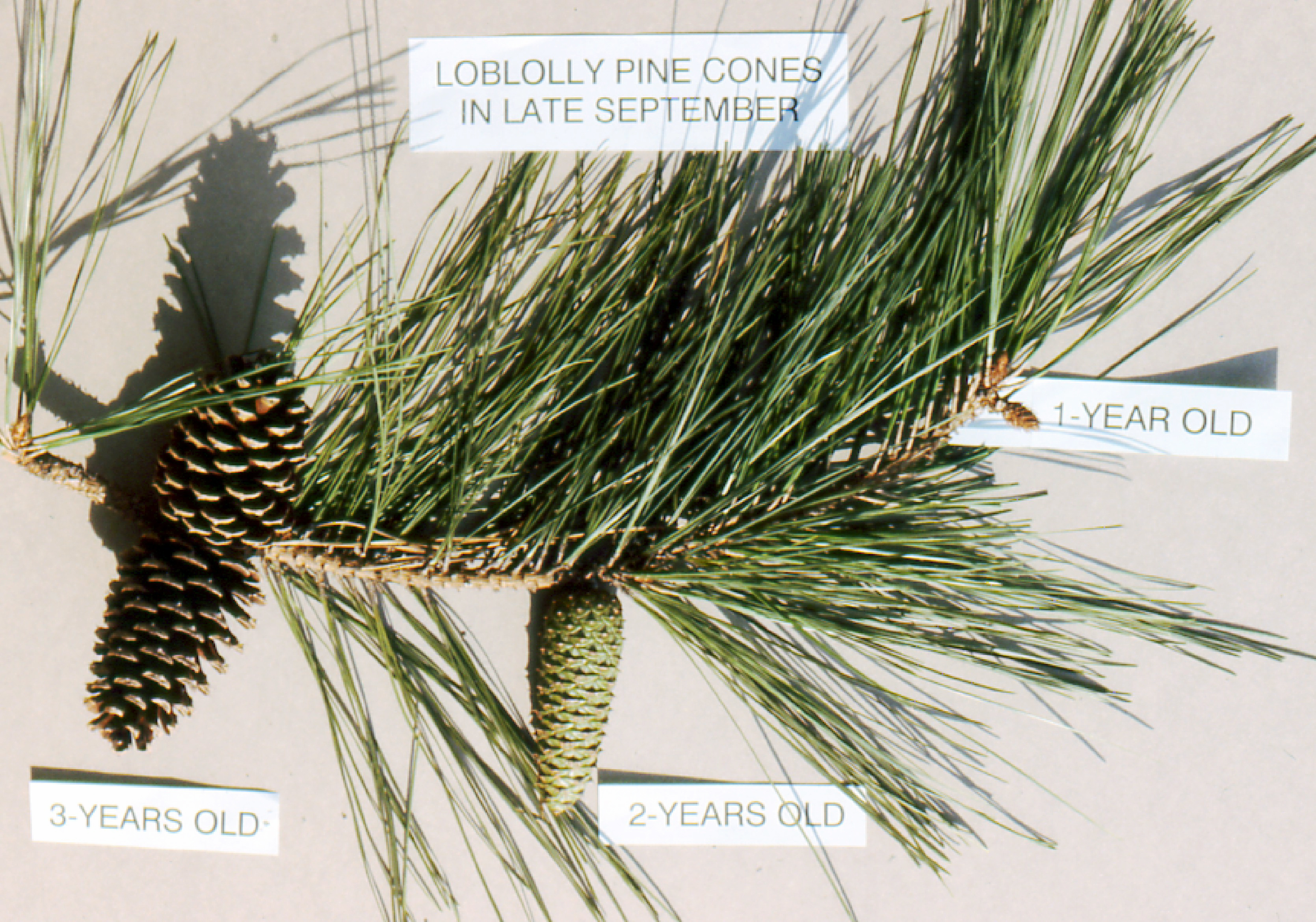
Loblolly pine branch with cones of different ages; two-year old cones will disperse seeds during fall and winter

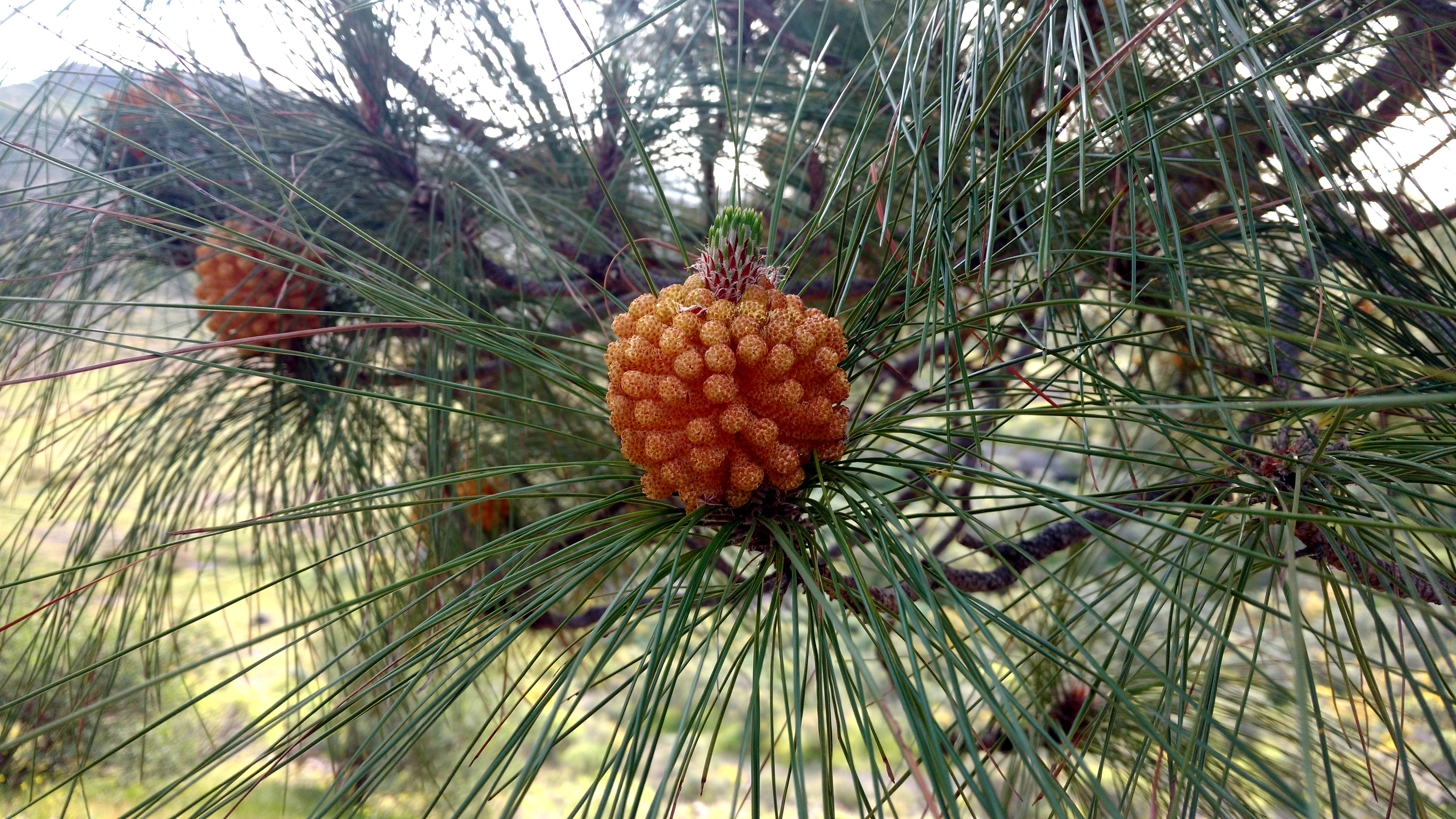
Pinus canariensis male cone in Gran Canaria

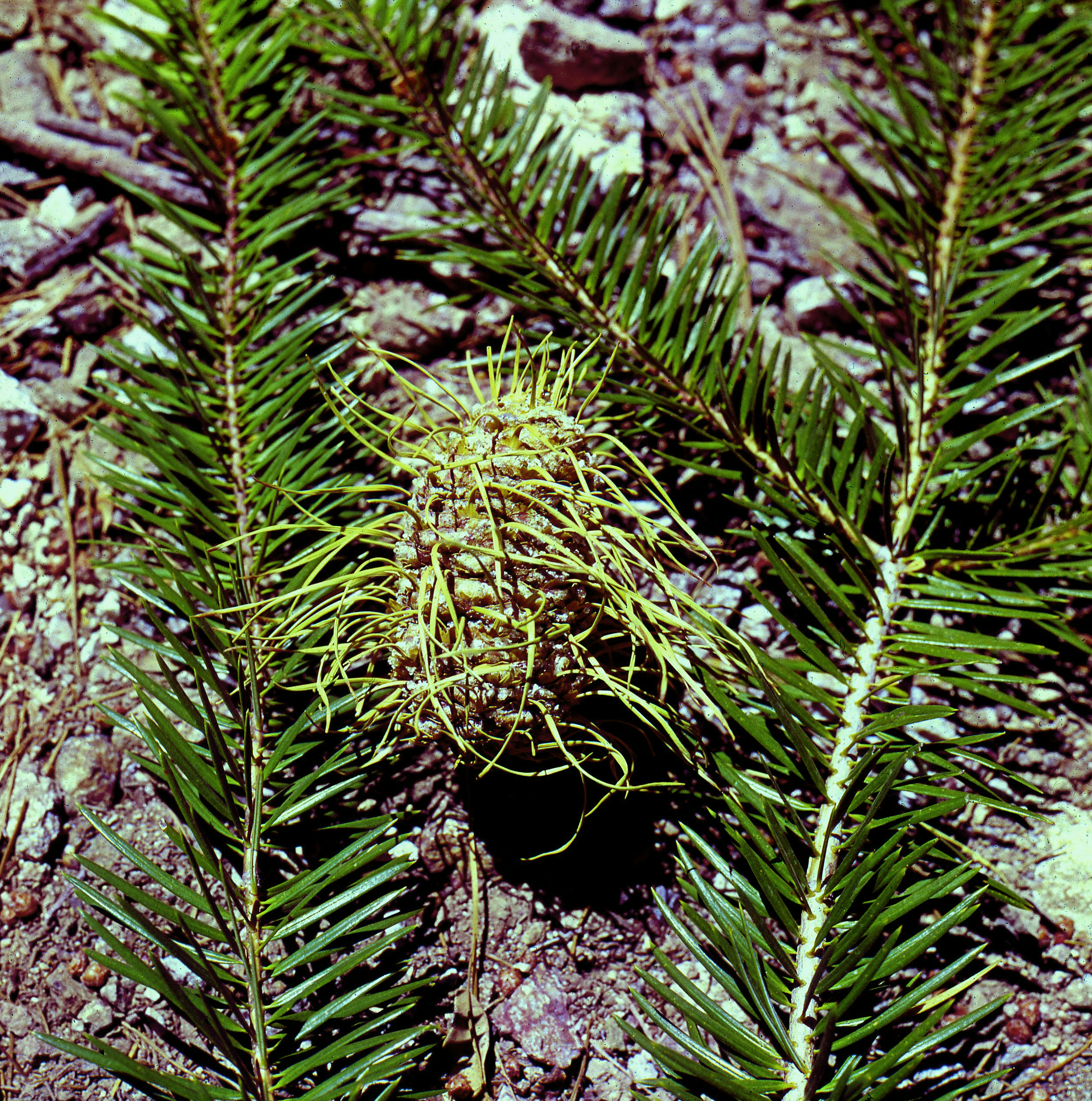
The cone structure of Abies bracteata

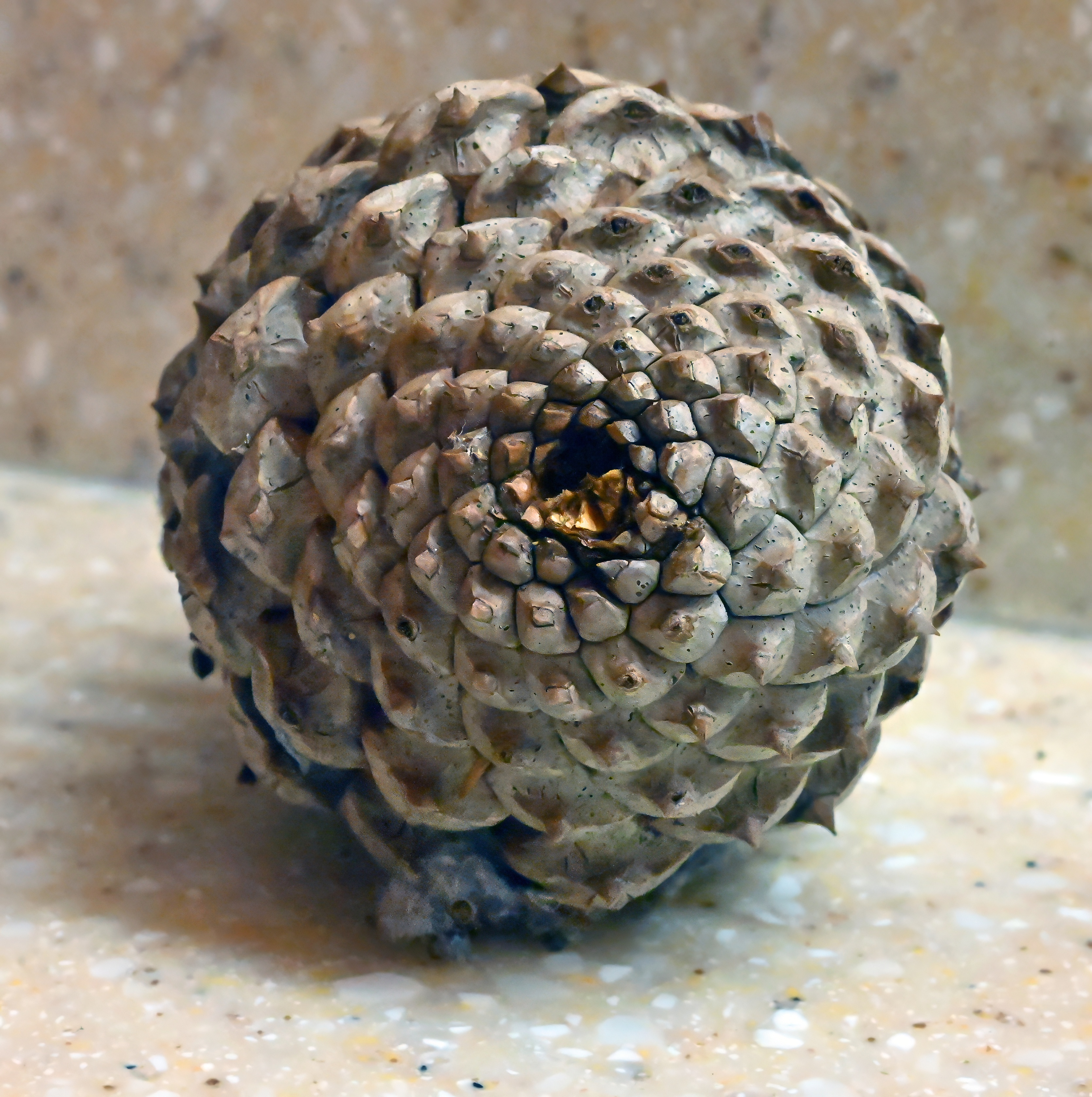
Top of a pine cone

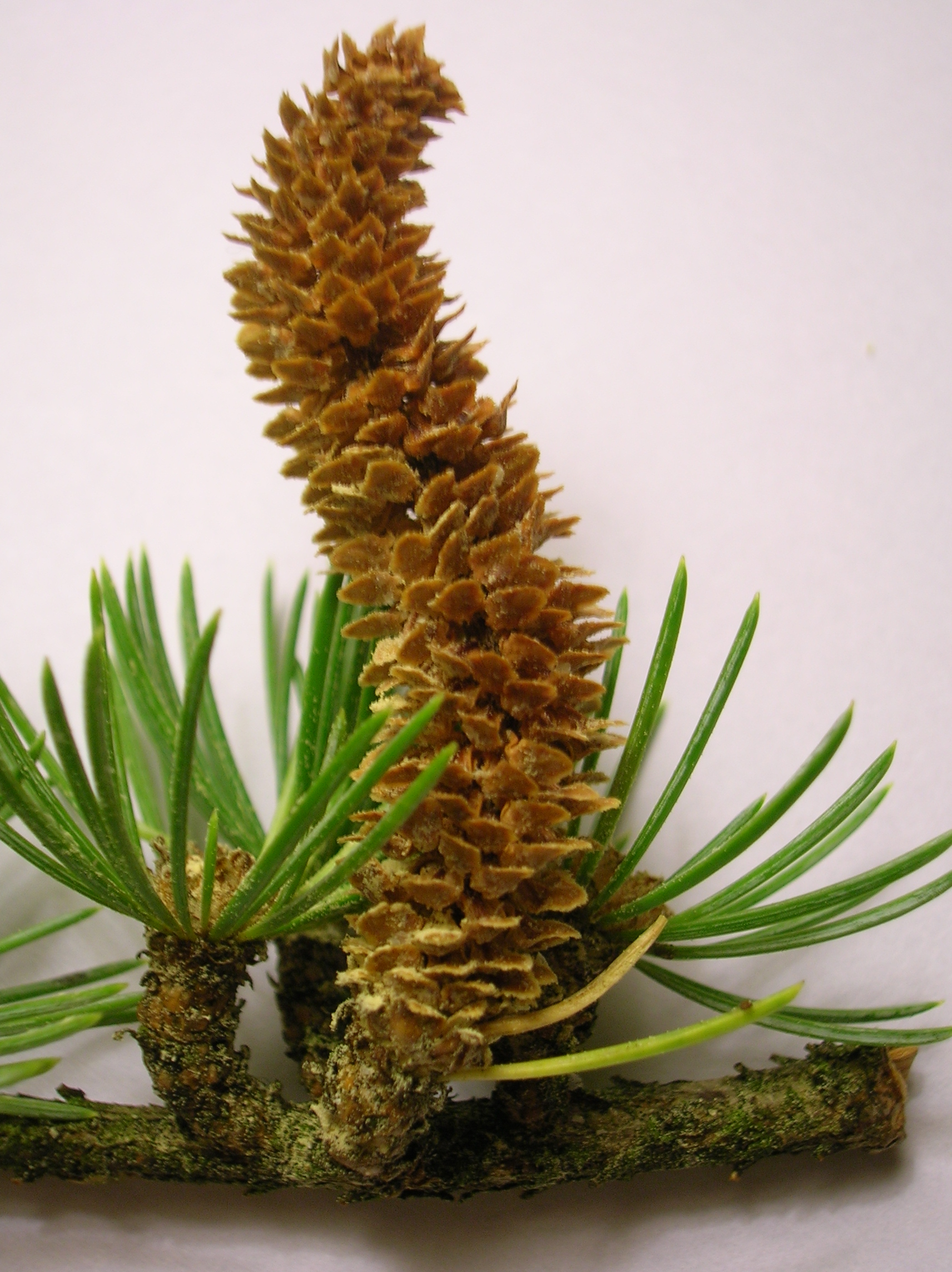
Male cone of cedar of Lebanon

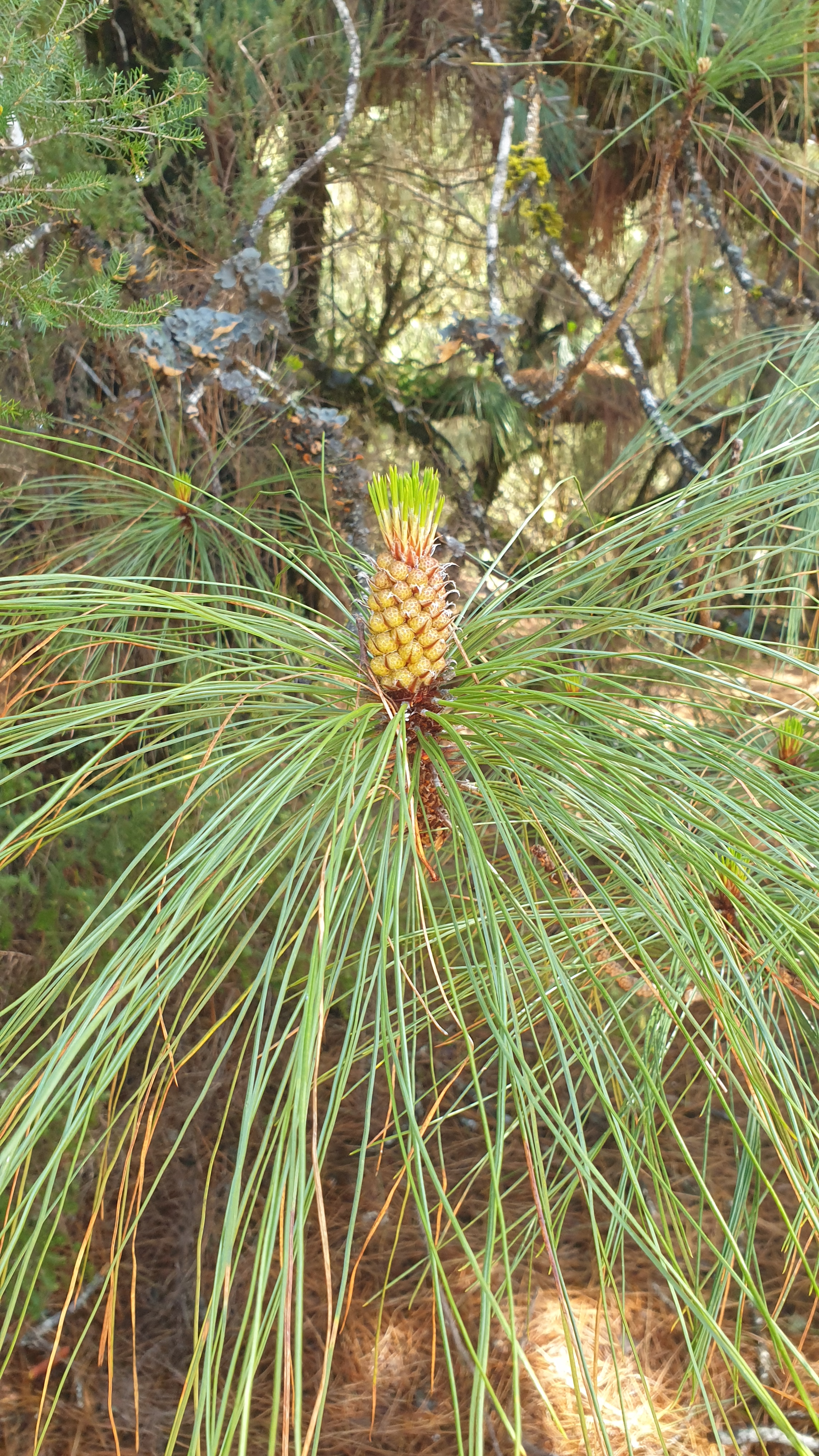
Male pollen cones of Pinus canariensis grouped in clusters reminiscent of the appearance of a pineapple, hence the name of the tropical pineapple fruit

== Location and distribution ==
Most conifer species are monoecious, with male and female cones occur on the same plant (tree or shrub), with female usually on the higher branches towards the top of the plant. This distribution is thought to improve chances of cross-fertilization, as pollen is unlikely to be blown vertically upward within the crown of one plant, but can drift slowly upward in the wind, blowing from low on one plant to higher on another plant. In some conifers, male cones additionally often grow clustered in large numbers together, while female cones are more often produced singly or in only small clusters. Some, such as Araucaria araucana and Taxus baccata, are dioecious, with the male and female cones usually on separate trees, but even in normally dioecious species, scattered individuals may produce cones of both sexes, or change which sex cones they produce over time. Some pines, notably Pinus discolor, are subdioecious, with individuals producing cones of both sexes, but with each tree producing either predominantly male, or predominantly female, cones, and only a few of the other sex.

A characteristic arrangement of pines is that the male cones are located at the base of the branch, while the female at the tip (of the same or a different branchlet). However, in larches and cedars, both types of cones are always at the tips of short shoots, while both sexes of fir cones are always from side buds, never terminal. There is also some diversity in bearing in Cupressaceae. Some Cupressus for instance, have little or no differentiation in the positions of male and female cones.

=== Crop potential ===
Cone crop potential can be predicted in various ways. An early indication of a potential crop can be a period of abnormally hot, dry weather at the time of bud differentiation, particularly if the current and preceding cone crops have been poor. Estimates of cone crop potential can be made by counting female reproductive buds in fall or winter, and an experienced observer can detect the subtle morphological differences and distinguish between reproductive buds and vegetative buds.

White spruce seed collection is expensive, and collection from cone caches of red squirrels is probably the cheapest method. The viability of seed from cached cones does not vary during current caching, but viability drops essentially to zero after being in caches for 1 or 2 years. Collection of cones in seed orchards has been facilitated by the counter-intuitive technique of "topping" and collection of cones from the severed crown tops at one-third the cost of collection from untopped trees and without decreasing cone production.

== Cultural uses ==
Cone in the coat of arms of Sarrant

Because of their widespread occurrence, conifer cones have been a traditional part of the arts and crafts of cultures where conifers are common. Examples of their use includes seasonal wreaths and decorations, fire starters, bird feeders, toys, etc. A derivation of the impossible bottle mechanical puzzle takes advantage of the fact that pine cones open and close based on their level of dryness. In constructing a display, a closed, damp cone of suitable size is inserted into a narrow-mouthed bottle and allowed to open upon drying.

Cone cows are traditional homemade toys, made by children using material found in nature. The most common design is a spruce or pine cone with sticks or matches for legs, which can easily be attached by forcing them between the cone scales. Playing with cone cows often includes building an animal enclosure from sticks. For the most part, cone cows have been displaced by manufactured toys, at least in affluent countries, but the creation of cone cows still enjoys some popularity as an outdoor activity for children. Cone cows are a part of children's culture in Finland where they are known as käpylehmä and Sweden where they are known as kottkor (cone animals).

In Sweden, a video game was released in which the player may build virtual cone cows. Swedish artist Lasse Åberg has created artwork with cone cows, which has been included in an alphabet book and featured on a Swedish postage stamp among other classic toys.

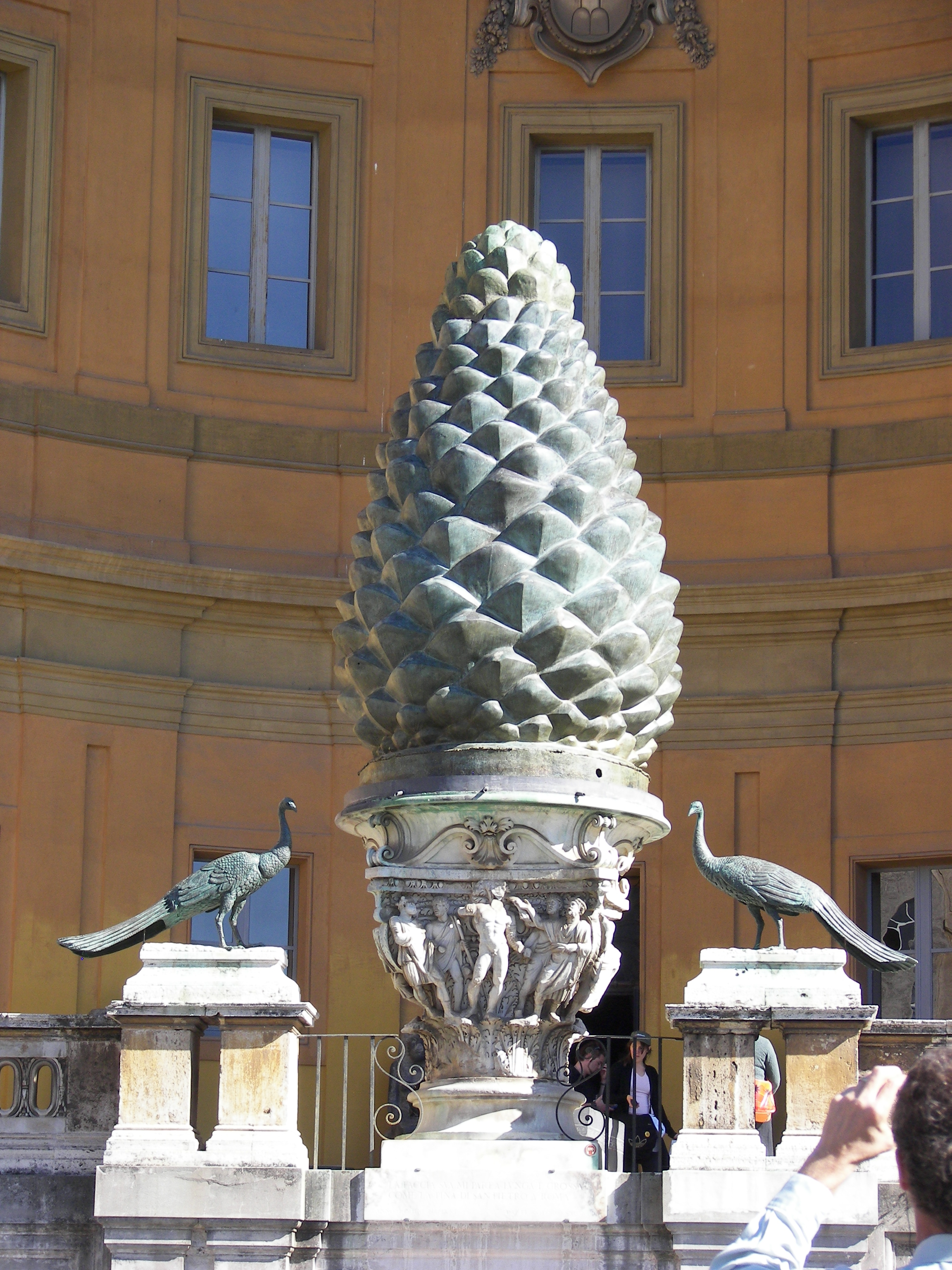
Pine cone statue from the Cortile della Pigna of the Vatican Museums

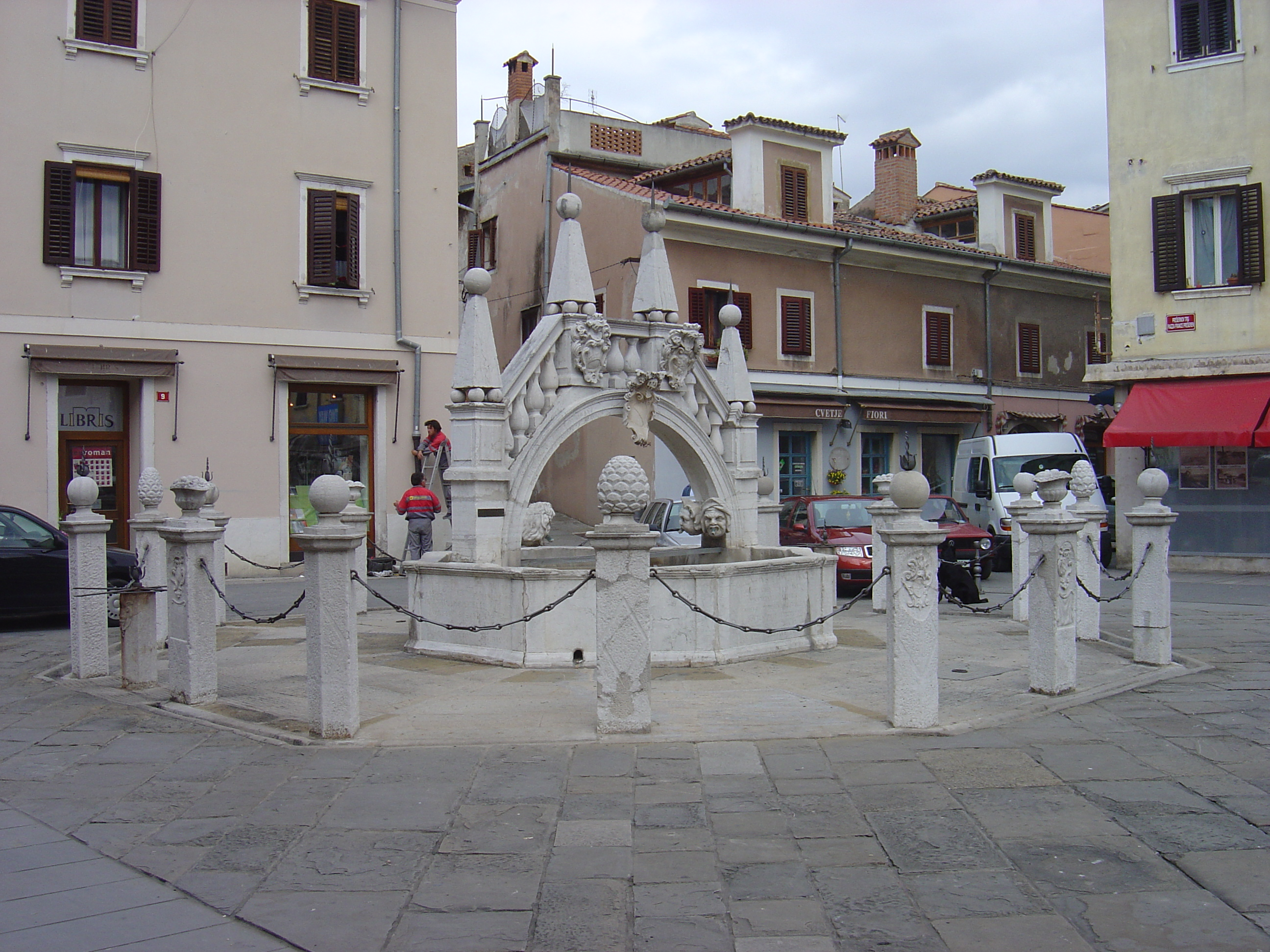
Da Ponte fountain in Koper

Cones are used as decorative elements in architecture such as on top of the posts surrounding Koper's Da Ponte Fountain, the central element of the Fontana della Pigna in Rome, or a bronze cone in the narthex of the Aachen Cathedral. Cones are occasionally used as a charge in heraldic coats of arms. In some parts of Russia and Georgia, immature pine cones are harvested in late spring and boiled to make sweet preserves.

Coat of arms of the Parthon de Von family featuring three pine cones

The pineal gland is named after the pine cone. Pine cones were also used as symbols of fertility in ancient Assyrian art. In Christian symbolism, they are closely related to the tree of life.

== See also ==
- Conifer nuts
- Parastichy
