= Galbulus =

A galbulus is a fleshy cone (megastrobilus), chiefly relating to those borne by junipers and cypresses, and often mistakenly called a berry. These cones (galbuli) are formed by fleshy cone scales which accrete into a single mass under a unified epidermis. Although originally used for the cypresses, the term is more applicable to the junipers.

== See also ==
- Aril, fleshy modified cone-scales also found in some species of gymnosperms
