= Aril =

Specialized outgrowth that covers a seed

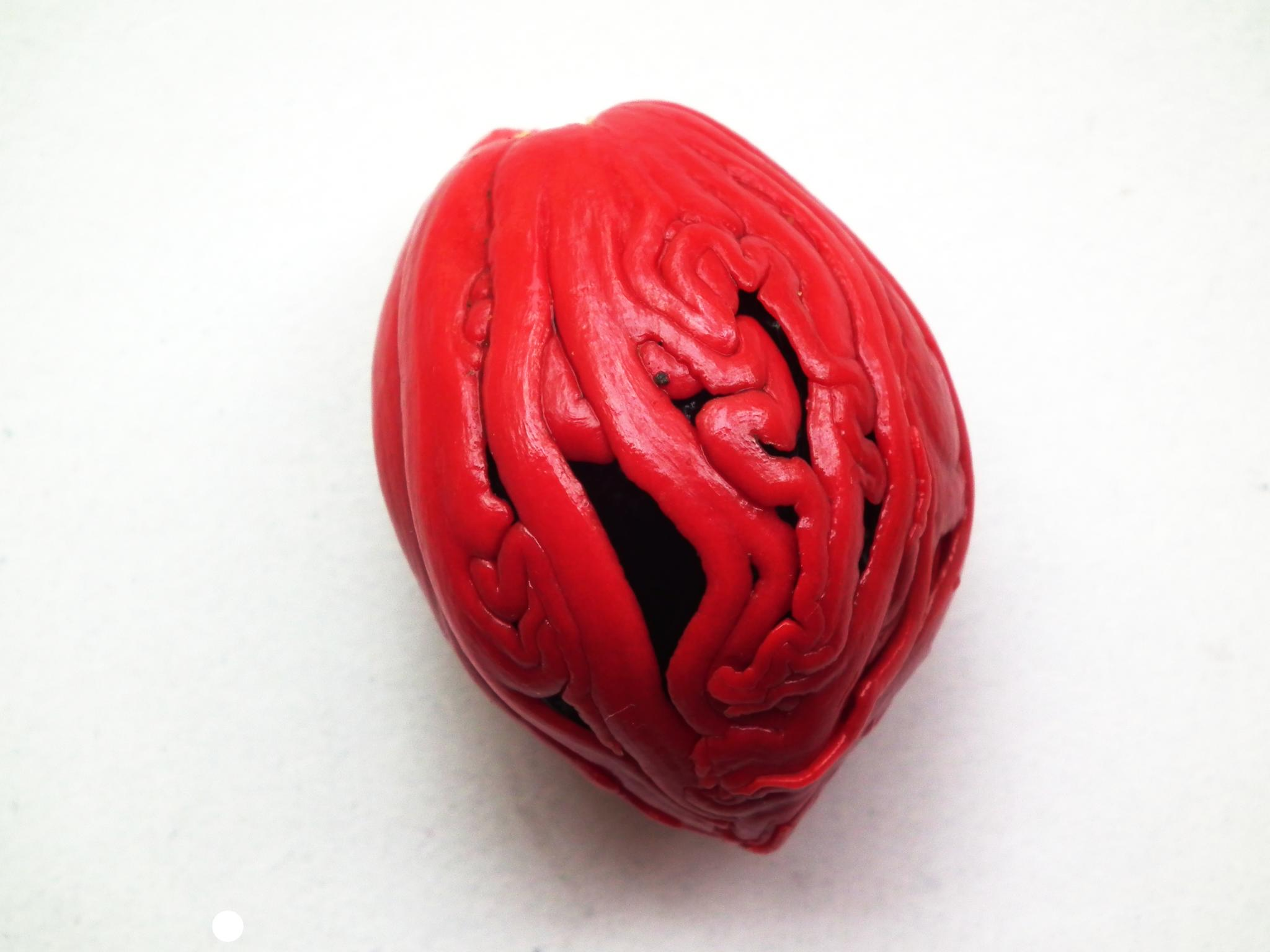
An aril that surrounds the nutmeg seed is used as a spice called mace

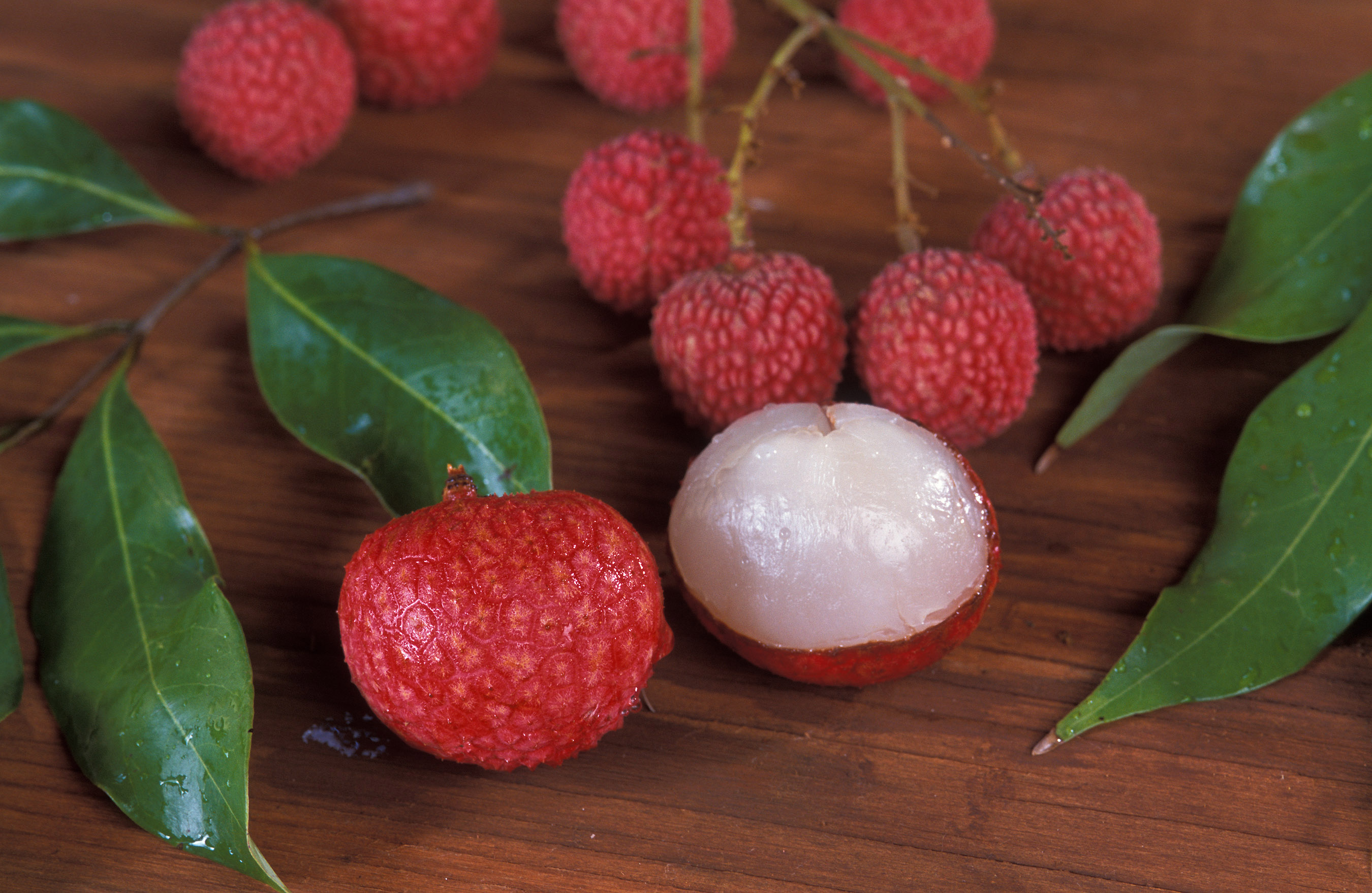
The edible white aril of Litchi chinensis is sometimes called an arillode or false aril. It grows partly from the funiculus and partly from the integument of the seed.

An aril (/ˈærɪl/), also called arillus (plural arilli), is a specialized outgrowth from a seed that partly or completely covers the seed. An arillode, or false aril, is sometimes distinguished: whereas an aril grows from the attachment point of the seed to the ovary (from the funiculus or hilum), an arillode forms from a different point on the seed coat. The term "aril" is sometimes applied to any fleshy appendage of the seed in flowering plants, such as the mace of the nutmeg seed. Arils and arillodes are often edible enticements that encourage animals to transport the seed, thereby assisting in seed dispersal. Pseudarils are aril-like structures commonly found on the pyrenes of Burseraceae species that develop from the mesocarp of the ovary. The fleshy, edible pericarp splits neatly in two halves, then falling away or being eaten to reveal a brightly coloured pseudaril around the black seed.

The aril may create a fruit-like structure, called (among other names) a false fruit. False fruit are found in numerous Angiosperm taxa. The edible false fruit of the longan, lychee and ackee fruits are highly developed arils surrounding the seed rather than a pericarp layer. Such arils are also found in a few species of gymnosperms, notably the yews and related conifers such as the lleuque and the kahikatea. Instead of the woody cone typical of most gymnosperms, the reproductive structure of the yew consists of a single seed that becomes surrounded by a fleshy, cup-like covering. This covering is derived from a highly modified cone scale.

== Development in Taxus ==
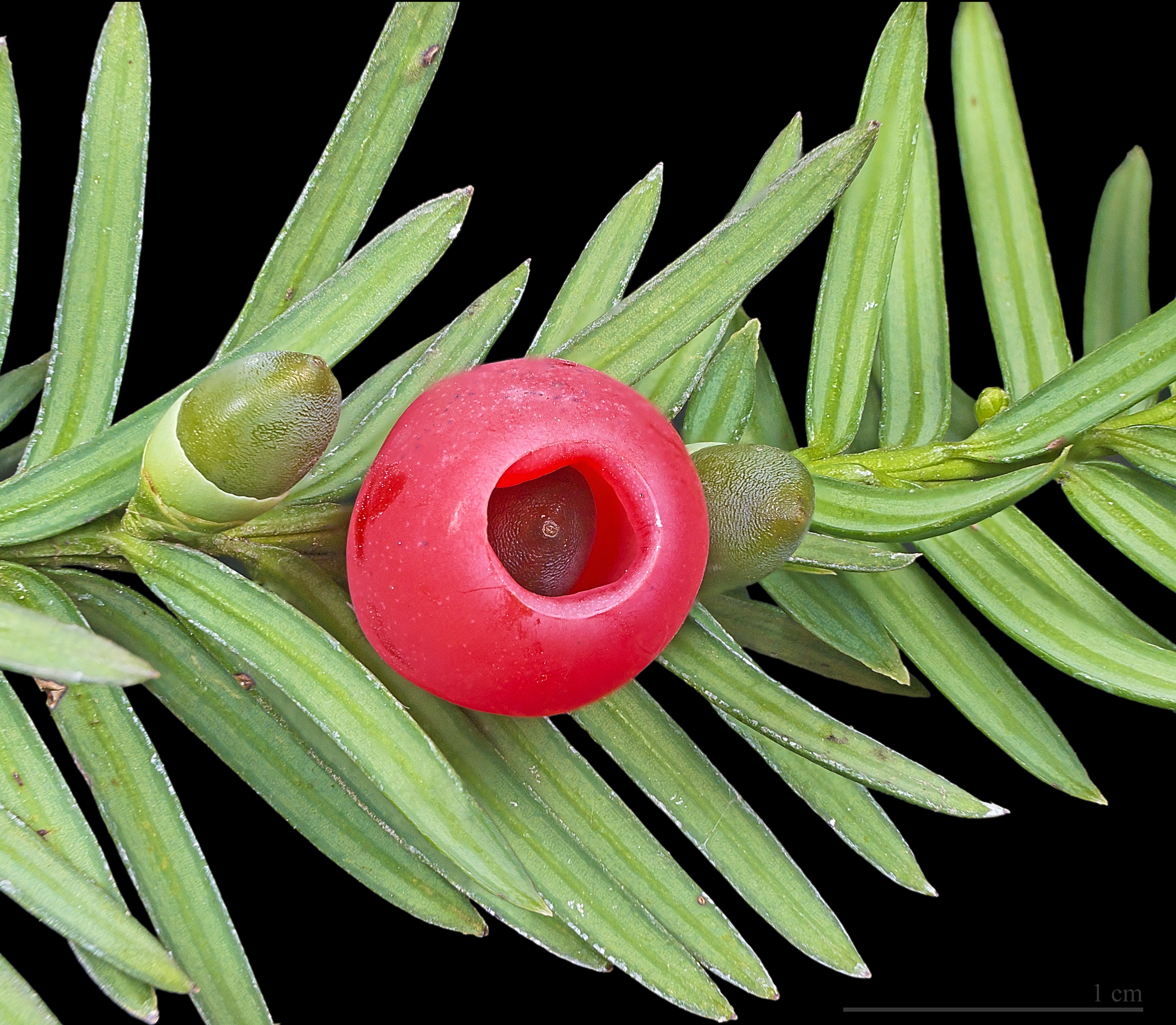
The fleshy aril that surrounds each seed in the yew is a highly modified seed cone scale

In European yew plants (Taxus baccata), the aril starts out as a small, green band at the base of the seed, then turns brown to red as it enlarges and surrounds the seed, eventually becoming fleshy and scarlet in color at maturity. The aril is attractive to fruit-eating birds and is non-toxic. All other parts of the yew are toxic, including the seed housed inside the aril. If the seed is crushed, breaks or splits in the stomach of a human, bird or another animal, it will result in poisoning. Birds digest the fleshy aril as a food source, and pass the seeds out in their droppings, promoting dispersal of the seeds.

== In Dacrycarpus dacrydioides ==
The kahikatea tree, Dacrycarpus dacrydioides, is native to New Zealand. In pre-European times the aril of the kahikatea was a food source for Māori. The washed arils were called koroi and were eaten raw.

== See also ==
- Elaiosome, fleshy structures attached to the seeds of many plant species
- Galbulus, a fleshy cone borne chiefly by junipers and cypresses
- Sarcotesta, a fleshy epidermal layer of a seed coat, as in pomegranate
