= Da Ponte Fountain =

Coordinates: 45°32′43.7″N 13°43′47.7″E

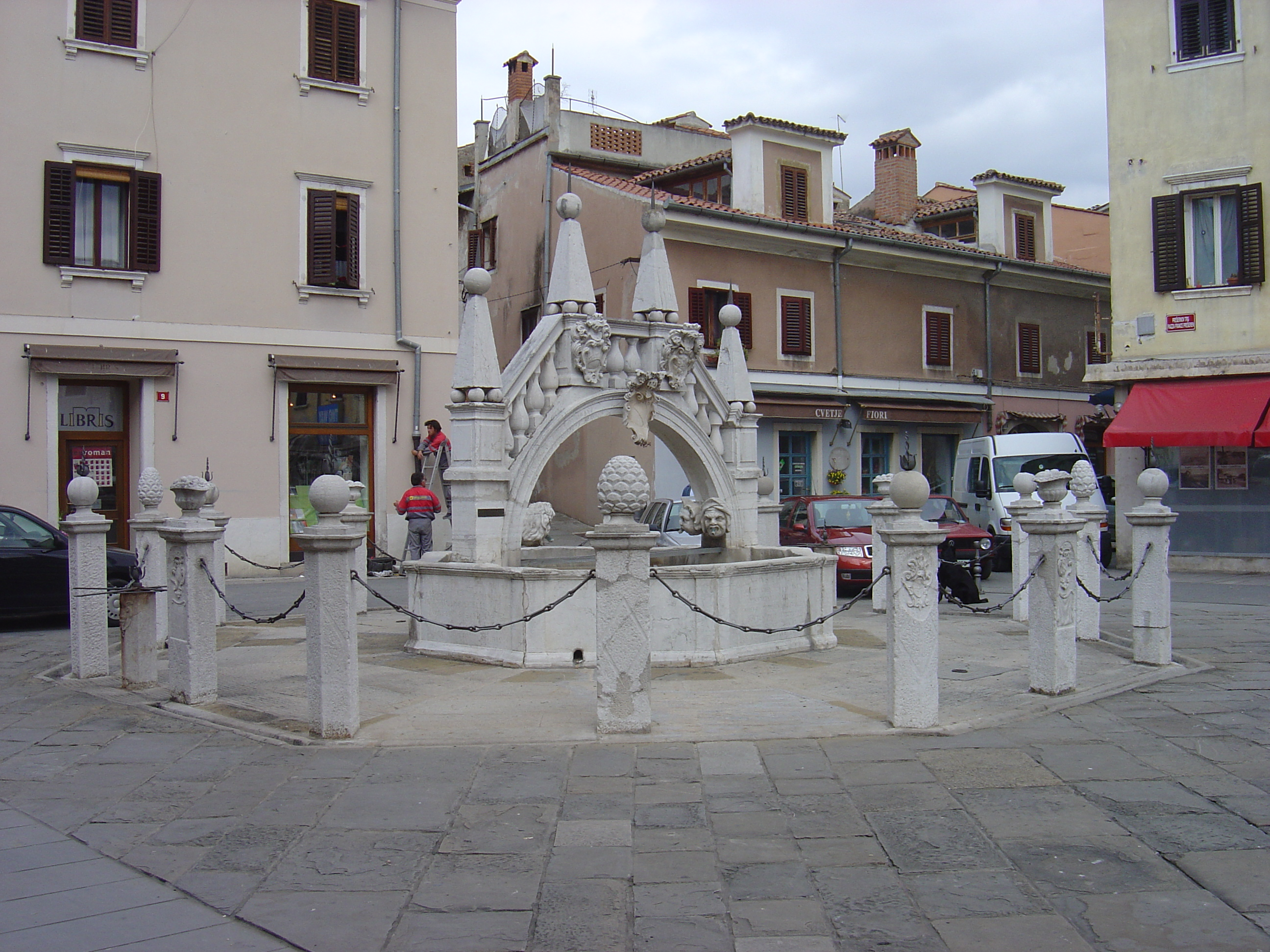
Da Ponte Fountain, Prešeren Square, Koper

The Da Ponte Fountain (Slovene: Da Pontejev vodnjak; Italian: fontana Da Ponte) is a fountain in the city of Koper, in southwestern Slovenia. It is located at Prešeren Square (Italian: piazza Prešeren), formerly known as Muda Square.

== History ==
A subaquatic aqueduct connected the island of Koper to the mainland as early as the end of the 14th century. By the 16th century, the 10,000 inhabitants of the city were facing a water shortage, rainwater cisterns having become inadequate. In the 17th century, Niccolò Manzuoli recorded the city water supply, noting that a 2-mile distant spring at Colonna was piped to the island via wooden underwater tubes, some of which have been unearthed during excavations by modern archeologists.

The current fountain dates from 1666, replacing an older one on the same site. Its superstructure is in the shape of a bridge, surmounting an octagonal water basin surrounded by fifteen pilasters, each bearing the arms of local noble families who had contributed funds toward the fountain.

The water spurts from four mascarons at the base of the arch. The fountain was used as a source of potable water until 1898.

In 1990, Prešeren Square was repaved, and the fountain extensively restored and renovated.
