= Goblet d'Alviella family =

- Country: Belgium
- Origin: Portugal
- Founded: 1668
- Motto: Simpliciter et Innocue (Simply and without hurting)
- Estate: Château de Court-St-Etienne

The Goblet d'Alviella family is an old family from Tournai and originally from the high Portuguese nobility dating back to 1668, it has been recognised in the Belgian nobility. On June 21, 1838, it received from Queen Mary II of Portugal, the hereditary title of "Count of Alviella" and "Grandesse" (see Grandesse of Spain) in favor of Albert Goblet. On November 20, 1838, King Leopold I of Belgium homologated the letters patent and authorized the family to hold this same title in Belgium. On February 22, 1845, Count Louis Goblet d'Alviella and his descendants were allowed to wear a crown of Marquis on their coats of arms instead of a crown of count, by King Leopold I of Belgium.

== Members ==
- Count Albert Joseph Goblet d'Alviella (1790–1873), officer
- Eugène, Count Goblet d'Alviella (10 August 1846 – 9 September 1925) was a lawyer, liberal senator of Belgium and a professor of the history of religions and rector of the Université libre de Bruxelles. He was the father of Félix.
- Félix, Count Goblet d'Alviella (Elsene, 26 May 1884-Brussels, 7 February 1957) was a Belgian lawyer, director of the Revue de Belgique, alderman and Olympic fencer. He was married to Eva Boël (1883–1956). He was a son of Eugène, and the father of Jean Goblet d'Alviella. He won a silver medal in the team épée competition at the 1920 Summer Olympics.
- Jean, Count Goblet d'Alviella (1921-13 July 1990), was the mayor of Court-Saint-Étienne. He was married with June Corfield. Together they have four children: Richard, Christine, Patrick, and Michael. He is a son of Félix Goblet d'Alviella.
- Count Richard Goblet d'Alviella (born 6 July 1948) is a Belgian businessman, who studied economics at the Université libre de Bruxelles, (Brussels), and obtained an MBA at the Harvard Business School. He is a son of Jean Goblet d'Alviella. On 22 July 1971, he married countess Veronique d'Oultremont. He is a member of the board of directors of the Groupe Danone and Sofina, director and member of the audit committee of the Delhaize Group, and SES.
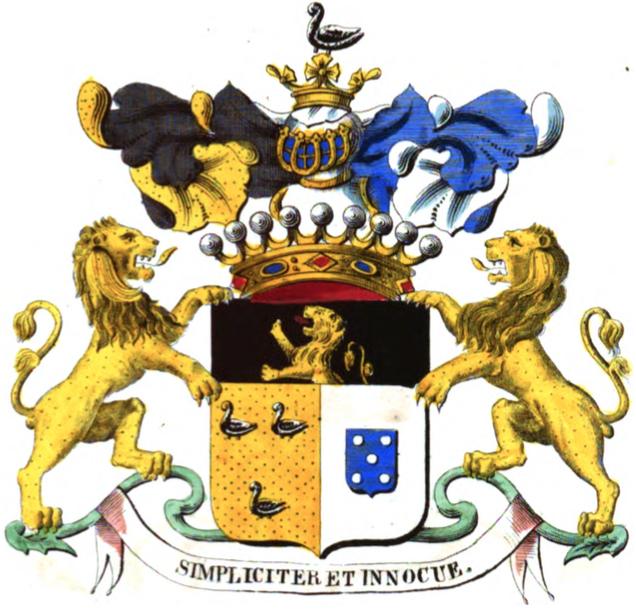
- Full coat of arms of the family.
  Count Michael Goblet d'Alviella is a Belgian liberal politician, former consul-general (Jerusalem, 1995–98), and mayor of Court-Saint-Étienne. He is a son of Jean Goblet d'Alviella.

== Sources and references ==
- Delhaize - Board of Directors
- Richard Goblet d'Alviella (Suez)
