= Marian H. Rose =

American physicist (1920–2025)

- Born: Marian Heineman; October 11, 1920; Brussels, Belgium
- Died: August 20, 2025 (aged 104); Bedford, New York, U.S.
- Occupations: Physicist, environmental activist
- Father: Dannie Heineman
- Relatives: Marion Wadsworth Cannon (cousin)

Marian Henrietta Heineman Rose (October 11, 1920 – August 20, 2025) was an American physicist and environmental activist. She was a research scientist at the Courant Institute of Mathematical Sciences at New York University from 1953 to 1973, and active in protecting the Croton Watershed in New York.

== Early life and education ==
Rose was born in Brussels, the daughter of American father and a German mother, Dannie Heineman and Hettie Meyer Heineman. Her father, an electrical engineer who was born in North Carolina and raised in Germany, headed SOFINA, a power company in Belgium. His cousin Marion Wadsworth Cannon was a poet and civil rights activist based in North Carolina.

She moved to the United States with her family in 1940, fleeing the Nazi occupations in Belgium and France. She graduated from Barnard College in 1942, and earned a master's degree in physics from Columbia University in 1944. She was the only woman doctoral student in physics at Harvard University when she completed her Ph.D. there in 1947. Her dissertation was titled "Kinetic Theory of Resistance in Rarefied Gases."

== Career ==
During World War II, Rose did research related to the Manhattan Project at Columbia. She was the first female teaching fellow in physics when she taught at Harvard University from 1946 to 1947. She was a research scientist at the Courant Institute of Mathematical Sciences at New York University from 1953 to 1973, and a visiting fellow at Yale University from 1981 to 1992. Her research involved magnetic confinement fusion. which she hoped would be a source of abundant power and "a means of preventing war". She retired in 1992.

She received Barnard University's Distinguished Alumna Award in 2007.

== Activism ==
Rose focused on environmental activism in her retirement. She was co-founder and president of the Croton Watershed Clean Water Coalition beginning in 1997, and founder of the Rose Family Foundation. She was an active member of the Bedford Conservation Board, the Bedford Wetlands Control Commission, the Heineman Foundation, and the Sierra Club. The town of Bedford marked her hundredth birthday with a "Marian Rose Day", but she responded to the fuss by saying "I don't know why 100 is considered special."

As a young woman in Europe, Rose protested against Francisco Franco during the Spanish Civil War. At age 104, she was a regular at No Kings protests against the Trump administration; she attended her last protest in Mount Kisco on August 16, 2025. "I've protested against fascism all my life," she said that day.

== Publications ==
- "On the Structure of a Steady Hydromagnetic Shock: One-Fluid Theory" (1956)
- "On the Diffusion of a Conduction Fluid Across a Magnetic Field" (1956)
- "On Plasma-Magnetic Shocks" (1960)
- "Drag on an Object in Nearly-Free Molecular Flow" (1964)
- "The Transitional Drag on a Cylinder at Hypersonic Mach Numbers" (1965)
- "A computation of the reflection and transmission coefficients for dielectric coated waveguides" (1986)
- "My view: Environment under GOP stealth attack" (1995)
- "Our view: Watershed agreement is not enough" (1997, with George Klein)
- "Our view: Filtration plant will have adverse impact" (1998, with Gudrun LeLash)
- "Preventing pollution is the key" (1998)

== Personal life and legacy ==
Rose married British attorney and World War II veteran Simon Rose in 1948. They had four children. Her husband died in 1981, after suffering a stroke she died on August 20, 2025, at the age of 104, in Bedford. State Assemblyman Chris Burdick said in tribute that "she was driven by the highest values and integrity I've ever seen."

The Society of Physics Students, part of the American Institute of Physics, established the Marian H. Rose Research Scholarship in 2025, in her honor.
