= Richard Goblet d'Alviella =

Belgian businessman (born 1948)

- Born: 6 July 1948 (age 78)
- Education: Université libre de Bruxelles
- Occupation: Businessman

Count Richard Goblet d'Alviella (born 6 July 1948) is a Belgian businessman, who studied economics at the Université libre de Bruxelles, (Brussels), and obtained an MBA at the Harvard Business School. He is a son of Jean Goblet d'Alviella and his wife, June Dierdre Corfield. He is the grandson of Sir Conrad Laurence Corfield.

On 22 July 1971, he married countess Veronique d'Oultremont.

He is a member of the board of directors of the Groupe Danone and Sofina, director and member of the audit committee of the Delhaize Group, and SES.

== Sofina ==
Goblet d'Alviella serves on the board of the Belgian holding company Sofina. Sofina's 2012 annual report lists him as executive chairman (Président Exécutif), with Harold Boël as managing director (Administrateur Délégué), the two signing.

== Sources ==
- Delhaize – Board of Directors
- Richard Goblet d'Alviella (Suez)
