= Jean Goblet d'Alviella =

Coat of arms

Jean, Count Goblet d'Alviella (3 June 1921 – 28 December 1990), was the mayor of Court-Saint-Étienne. He was married with June Corfield. Together they have four children: Richard Goblet d'Alviella, Christine Goblet d'Alviella, Patrick Goblet d'Alviella, and Michael Goblet d'Alviella. He is a son of Félix Goblet d'Alviella.
