= May Claerhout =

Belgian artist

- Born: 21 February 1939; Pittem, Belgium
- Died: 7 November 2016 (aged 77); Oostmalle, Belgium
- Known for: Sculpture
- Spouse: Armand Storms
- Website: www.mayclaerhout.be

May Claerhout (21 February 1939 – 7 November 2016) was a Belgian artist who was born in Pittem. She created sculptures in bronze and terracotta, and she created several statues for public buildings in Belgium. Her studio was located in Malle. Claerhout was married to Armand Storms and together they had three children.

== Works ==
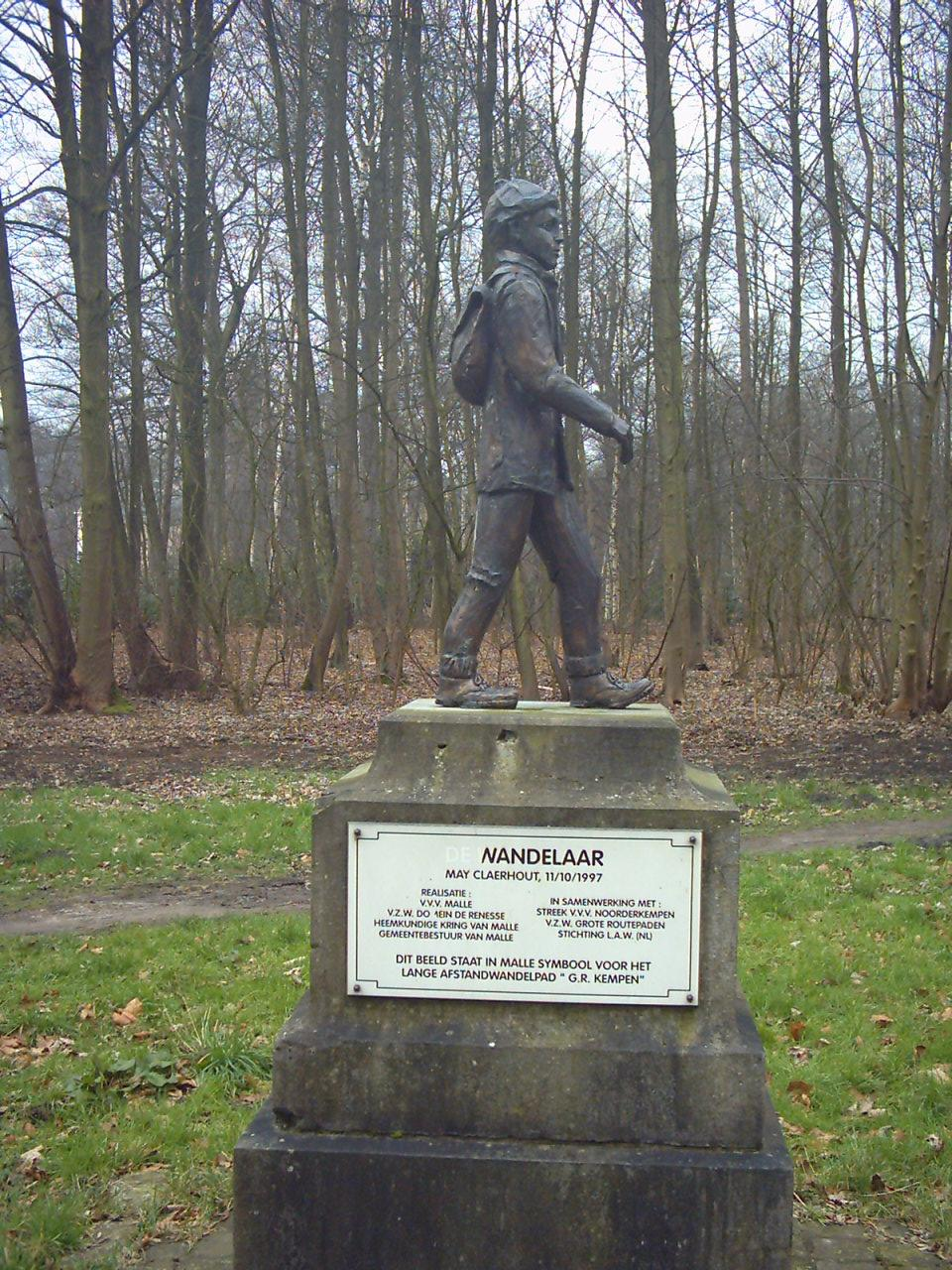
De Wandelaar, The walker in the garden of Castle de Renesse in Oostmalle

- Statue Europe (bronze, 20 December 1993), in the Espace Léopold, the complex of parliament buildings in Brussels housing the European Parliament, given by the Belgian presidency Espace Léopold
- Statue Father Damien (bronze)
- 5 Continents (bronze)
- History of scripture (bronze)
- Birth of Mankind (bronze)
- Metro in the city (red terracotta, Metrostation Opera on crossing Keizerlei and Meir, Antwerp)
- City, Stream en Metro (white, glazed terracotta, Metrostation Frederik van Eden, Leftbank, Antwerp)
- Union (white, glazed terracotta)
- Ziekenzorg (red terracotta)
- Generations (red terracotta)
- Debat (red terracotta)
- Aula (white, glazed terracotta)
