= Chevalier Medal for Oriental Art =

Belgian award for sciences and arts

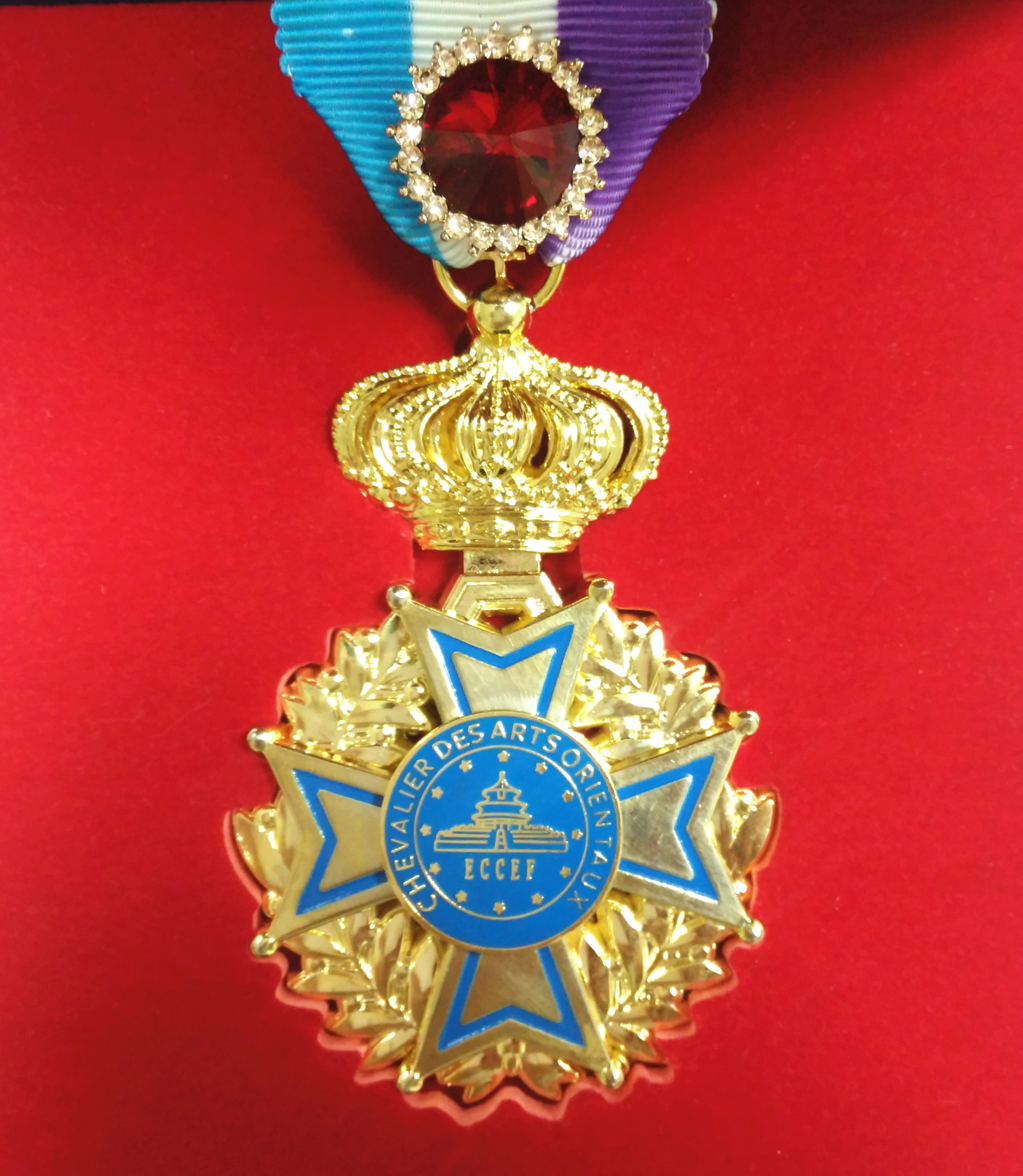
Chevalier Medal for Oriental Art (Chevalier Des Arts Orientaux) was initiated by Belgium societies, in order to commemorate Father Ferdinand Verbiest

The Chevalier Medal for Oriental Art (Chevalier Des Arts Orientaux) was initiated by various circles of society, in order to commemorate Father Ferdinand Verbiest, a Belgian scientist, philosopher, astronomer who had lived in China 300 years before the prize was instituted. The aim was to promote cooperation between the East and West, and to award those skillful but humble people who had made outstanding contributions in multiple areas such as science and art.

Since 2013, the Europe-China Cultural and Educational Foundation which was registered in Antwerp has managed the award.

The candidates are nominated by governments, organizations, and art institutions; the winner is evaluated and selected by more than three Belgian jury members. No commercial institution is allowed in the process of nomination and evaluation. The award ceremony is usually held in a traditional European style, while the place of awarding is not fixed.

This award has become widely respected in several different European countries due to its pragmatic and low-key approach. Before that, the award has only ever been given to Chinese artists and dignitaries.
