= Félix de Muelenaere =

Belgian politician

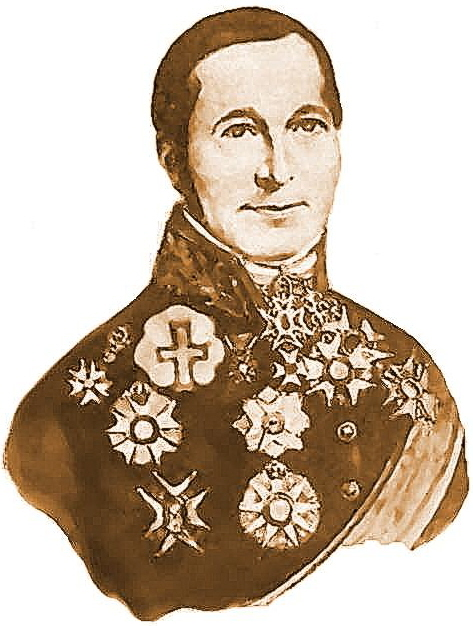

Prime Minister of Belgium
- In office 21 July 1831 – 20 October 1832
- Monarch: Leopold I
- Preceded by: Joseph Lebeau
- Succeeded by: Albert Joseph Goblet d'Alviella

Personal details
- Born: 5 April 1793 Pittem, Austrian Netherlands (now Belgium)
- Died: 5 August 1862 (aged 69) Pittem, Belgium
- Party: Catholic Party

Félix Amandus, Count de Muelenaere (5 April 1793 – 5 August 1862) was a Belgian Roman Catholic politician who served as the prime minister of Belgium from 1831 to 1832.

== Biography ==
Born in Pittem, he was a lawyer in Bruges and was from 1824 until 1829 member of the Second Chamber of the United Kingdom of the Netherlands for the province of West Flanders. After the independence of Belgium, he became provincial governor in West Flanders (1830–1831), member of the Belgian Chamber of Representatives for the arrondissement of Bruges (1831–1848), and Minister of Foreign Affairs in the first Belgian government.

After the inauguration of Leopold I as king in 1831, he became the third Prime Minister until 1832. Afterward, he became again provincial governor for West-Flanders (1832–1834, 1836–1849) and Minister of Foreign Affairs (1834–1836, 1841). From 1850 until his death in 1862 in his birthplace Pittem, he was member of the Chamber for the arrondissement of Tielt.

== Honours ==
National

- Belgium:
  - Iron Cross.
  - Minister of State, by royal decree
  - 1856: Grand Cordon in the Order of Leopold

Foreign

- Kingdom of France: Grand Officier in the Legion of Honour
- Spain: Knight Grand Cross in the Order of Charles III
- Denmark: Knight Grand Cross in the Order of the Dannebrog
- Kingdom of Portugal: Knight Grand cross of the Order of the Immaculate Conception of Vila Viçosa
- Kingdom of the Netherlands: Knight in the Order of the Netherlands Lion
- Saxe-Coburg and Gotha: Knight Grand Cross in the Saxe-Ernestine House Order

Political offices
Preceded by Joseph Lebeau	Prime Minister of Belgium; 1831–1832	Succeeded by Albert Joseph Goblet d'Alviella
