= Ferdinand Verbiest =

Flemish Jesuit missionary (1623–1688)

The Reverend Ferdinand Verbiest SJ
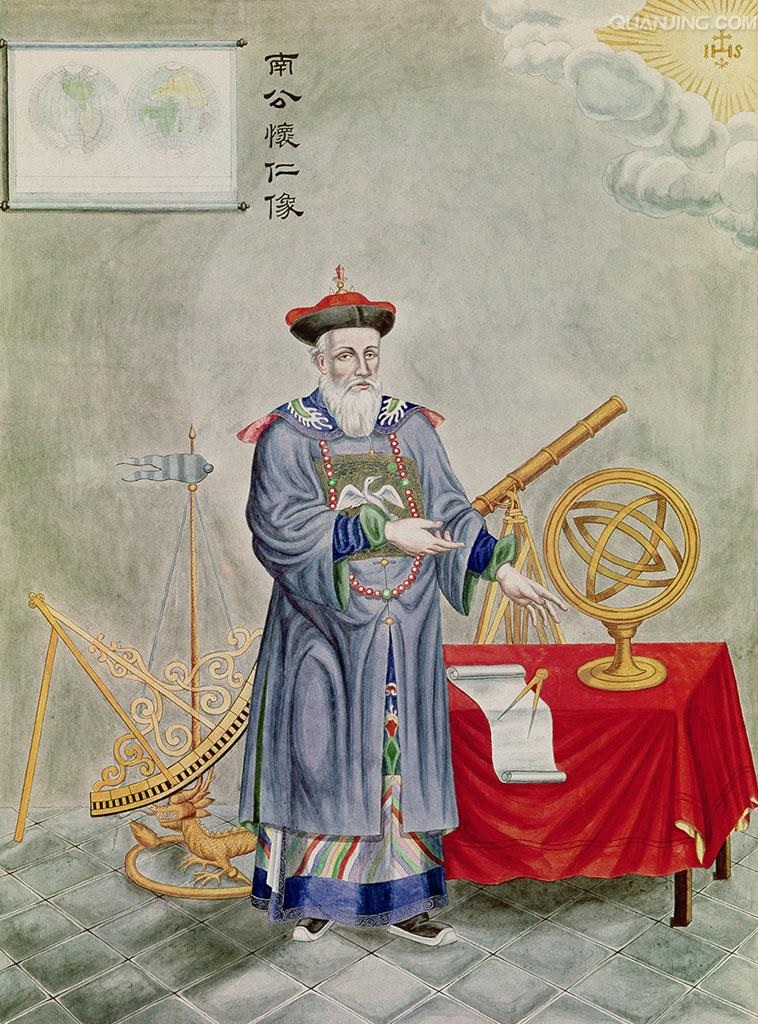
- Portrait of Ferdinand Verbiest
- Born: 9 October 1623; Pittem, Tielt, County of Flanders, Spanish Netherlands
- Died: 28 January 1688 (aged 64); Beijing, Qing Dynasty
- Resting place: Zhalan Cemetery, Beijing
- Occupation: Jesuit missionary

Ferdinand Verbiest
- Traditional Chinese: 南懷仁
- Simplified Chinese: 南怀仁
Transcriptions
Standard Mandarin
- Hanyu Pinyin: Nán Huáirén

Ferdinand Verbiest SJ (9 October 1623 – 28 January 1688) was a Flemish Jesuit missionary in China during the Qing dynasty. He was born in Pittem near Tielt in the County of Flanders (now part of Belgium). He is known as Nan Huairen (南懷仁) in Chinese.

He was an accomplished mathematician and astronomer and proved to the court of the Kangxi Emperor that European astronomy was more accurate than Chinese astronomy. He then corrected the Chinese calendar and was later asked to rebuild and re-equip the Beijing Ancient Observatory, being given the roles of Head of the Mathematical Board and Director of the Observatory.

He became close friends with the Kangxi Emperor, who frequently requested his instruction in geometry, philosophy and music. Verbiest worked as a diplomat, cartographer, and translator; he spoke Latin, German, Dutch, Spanish, Hebrew, Italian and Manchu. He wrote more than thirty books.

During the 1670s, Verbiest designed what some claim to be the first ever self-propelled vehicle, in spite of its small size, not being able to carry a driver or goods, and the lack of evidence that it was actually built. He died in 1688. He was granted the posthumous name "Qínmǐn" (勤敏) by Kangxi Emperor.

== Early life ==
Ferdinand Verbiest was the eldest child of Joos Verbiest, a bailiff and tax collector of Pittem near Kortrijk, Belgium. Verbiest studied humanities with the Jesuits, in Bruges and Kortrijk, and next went to the Lelie College in Leuven for a year to study philosophy and mathematics. He joined the Society of Jesus (Jesuits) on 2 September 1641. Verbiest continued studying theology in Seville, where he was ordained as a priest in 1655. He completed his studies in astronomy and theology in Rome. His intention had been to become a missionary in the Spanish missions to Central America, but this was not to be. His call was to the Far East, where the Roman Catholic Church was 'on a mission' to compensate for the loss of (Catholic) believers to the emerging Protestantism in Europe.

On 4 April 1657, Verbiest left for China from Lisbon, accompanied by Father Martino Martini, thirty-five other missionaries, the Portuguese Viceroy of the Indies and some other passengers. Their boat reached Macau on 17 July 1658, by which time all but ten of the passengers, including the Viceroy and most of the missionaries, had died. Verbiest took up his first posting in Shaanxi, leading the mission until 1660 when he was called to assist – and later replace – Father Johann Adam Schall von Bell, the Jesuit Director of the Beijing Observatory and Head of the Mathematical Board, in his work in astronomy. Unfortunately for them, the political situation shifted dramatically in 1661, after the death of the young Shunzhi Emperor aged 23. His son and successor, Xuanye (the Kangxi Emperor), was only 7, so the government was placed in the hands of four regents. Unlike Shunzhi, the regents were not in favour of the Jesuits, who suffered increased persecution as a result.

== Astronomy contests ==
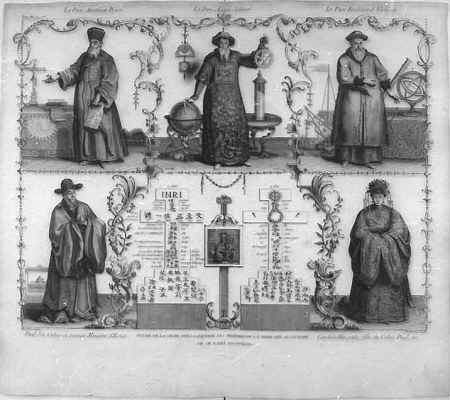
An engraving from a French book about the Chinese empire, published in 1736. Represented from left to right: Top: Matteo Ricci, Johann Adam Schall von Bell, Ferdinand Verbiest Bottom: Xu Guangqi, colao or Prime Minister of State; Candide Hiu, grand-daughter of Colao Paul Siu.

In 1664, the Chinese astronomer Yang Guangxian (1597–1669), who had published a pamphlet against the Jesuits, challenged Schall von Bell to a public astronomy competition. Yang won and took Schall von Bell's place as Head of Mathematics. Having lost the competition, Schall von Bell and the other Jesuits were chained and thrown into a filthy prison, accused of teaching a false religion. They were bound to wooden pegs in such a way that they could neither stand nor sit and remained there for almost two months until a sentence of strangulation was imposed. A high court found the sentence too light and ordered them to be cut up into bits while still alive. Fortunately for them, on 16 April 1665, a violent earthquake destroyed the part of the prison chosen for the execution. An extraordinary meteor was seen in the sky, and a fire destroyed the part of the imperial palace where the condemnation was pronounced. This was seen as an omen and all the prisoners were released. However, they still had to stand trial, and all the Jesuits but Verbiest, Schall von Bell and two others were exiled to Canton. Schall von Bell died within a year, due to the conditions of his confinement.

In 1669, the Kangxi Emperor managed to take power by having the last remaining corrupt regent Oboi arrested. In the same year, the emperor was informed that serious errors had been found in the calendar for 1670, which had been drawn up by Yang Guangxian. Kangxi commanded a public test to compare the merits of European and Chinese astronomy. The test was to predict three things: the length of the shadow thrown by a gnomon of a given height at noon of a certain day; the absolute and relative positions of the Sun and the planets on a given date; and the exact time of an anticipated lunar eclipse. It was decided that Yang and Verbiest should each use their mathematical skills to determine the answers and that "The Heavens would be the judge". The contest was held at the Bureau of Astronomy in the presence of senior-ranking government ministers and officials from the observatory. Unlike Yang, Verbiest had access to the latest updates on the Rudolphine Tables, and was assisted by telescopes for observation. He succeeded in all three tests and was immediately installed as the Head of the Mathematical Board and Director of the Observatory. Out of consideration for him, the exiled Jesuits were authorized to return to their missions. Meanwhile, Yang was sentenced to the same death he had planned for his Jesuit rival, but the sentence was reduced to exile and he died en route to his native home.

== Initial projects ==
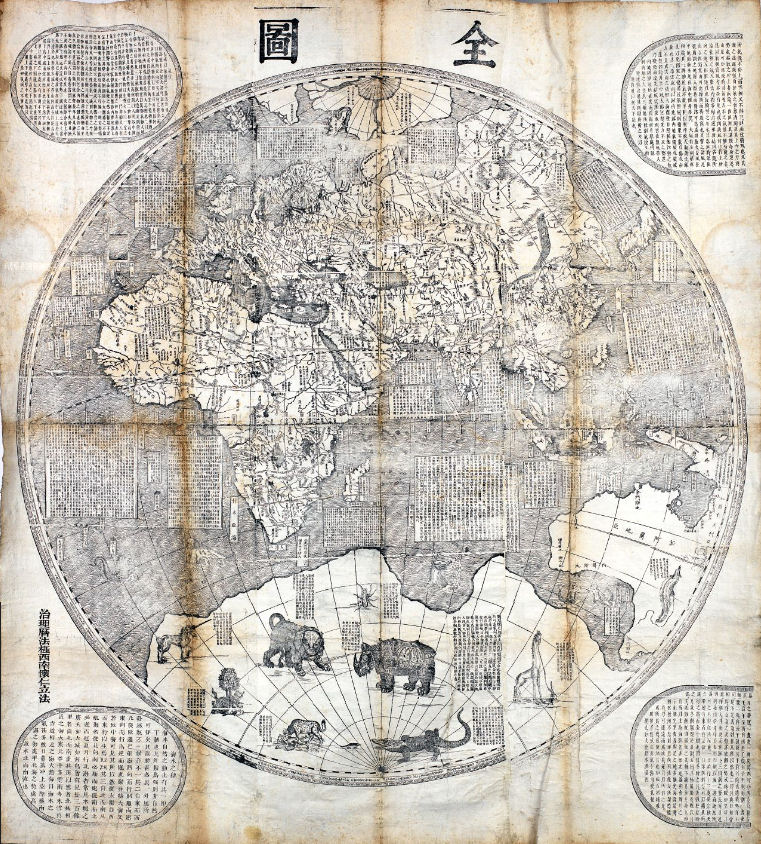
Ferdinand Verbiest published the Kunyu Quantu world map in 1674.

The 1670 calendar included an extra month unnecessarily added to hide other errors and to bring the lunar months in line with the solar year. Verbiest suggested the errors should be corrected, including removing the extra month. This was an audacious move, as the calendar had been approved by the emperor himself. Fearing the emperor's response, the observatory officials begged him to withdraw this request, but he responded: "It is not within my power to make the heavens agree with your calendar. The extra month must be taken out." Much to their surprise, the emperor, after studying the research, agreed, and it was done.

After this, Verbiest and the emperor formed a real friendship, with the Jesuit teaching him geometry, philosophy and music. He was frequently invited to the palace and to accompany the Emperor on his expeditions throughout the empire. He translated the first six books of Euclid into Manchu and took every opportunity to introduce Christianity. In response, the Emperor elevated him to the highest grade of the mandarinate and granted permission for him to preach Christianity anywhere in the empire.

Verbiest undertook many projects, including the construction of an aqueduct, the casting of 132 cannons for the imperial army – far superior to any previous Chinese weapons – and the design of a new gun carriage. He created star charts for the Kangxi Emperor in order to tell the time at night. Other inventions included a steam engine to propel ships.

=== Instruments for Beijing Observatory ===
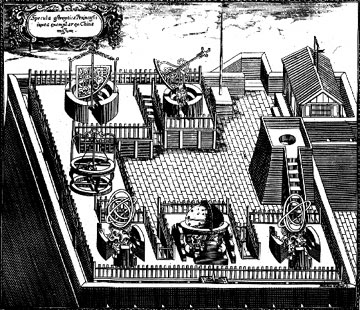
Instruments in the Beijing Observatory. Some of them were built by Verbiest.

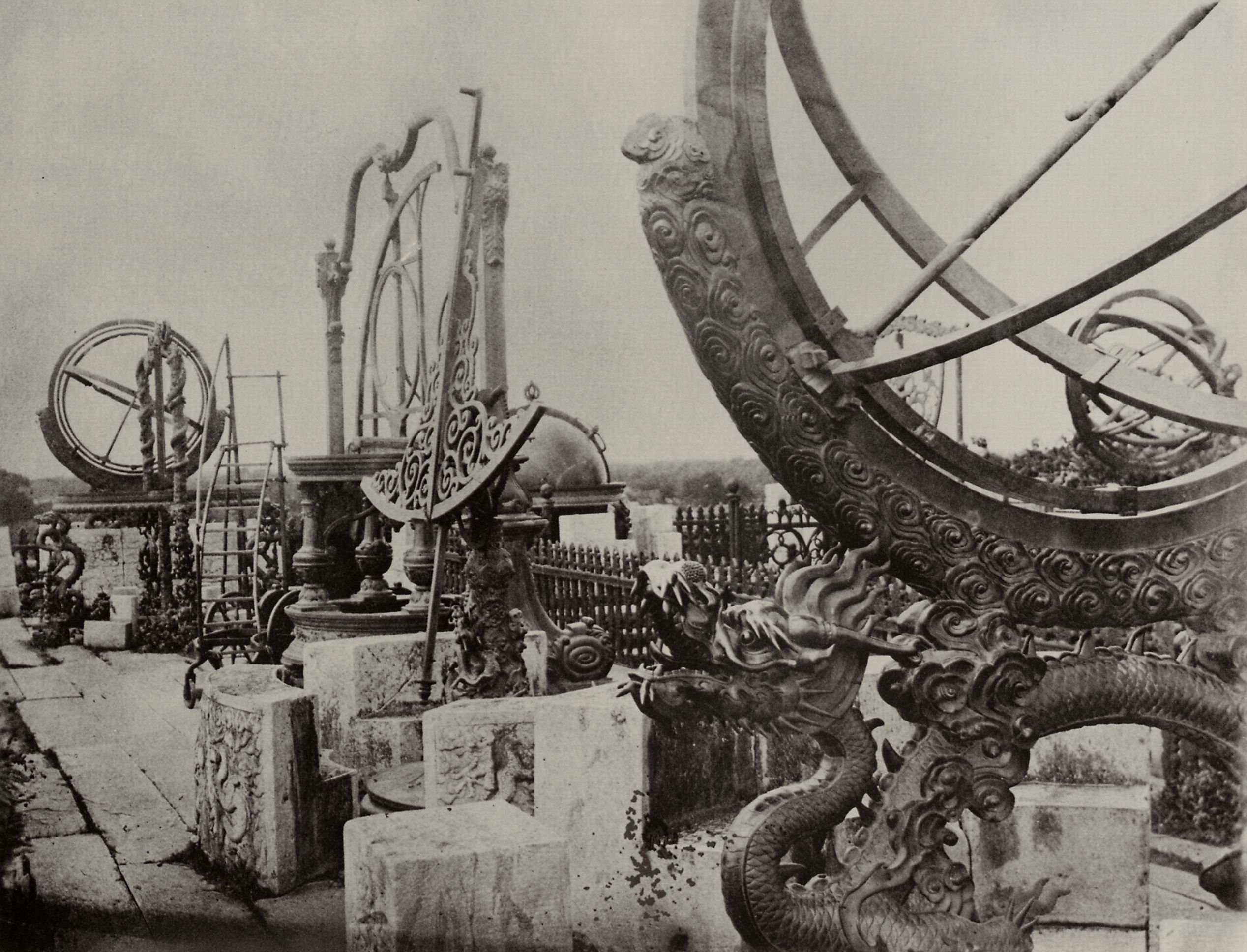
The Verbiest instruments on the terrace of the observatory. Photograph by Thomas Child, c. 1875.

Having resolved the issues surrounding the calendar, Verbiest went on to compose a table of all solar and lunar eclipses for the next 2000 years. Delighted with this, the emperor awarded him complete charge of the imperial astronomy observatory, which he rebuilt in 1673. The existing equipment was obsolete, so Verbiest consigned it to a museum and set about designing six new instruments:

- Altazimuth, used to measure the position of celestial bodies relative to the celestial horizon and the zenith – the altitude azimuth.
- Celestial globe, six feet in diameter, used to map and identify celestial objects. A copy donated by the Chinese government is on display at the Ferdinand Verbiest Institute of the Katholieke Universiteit Leuven in Belgium.

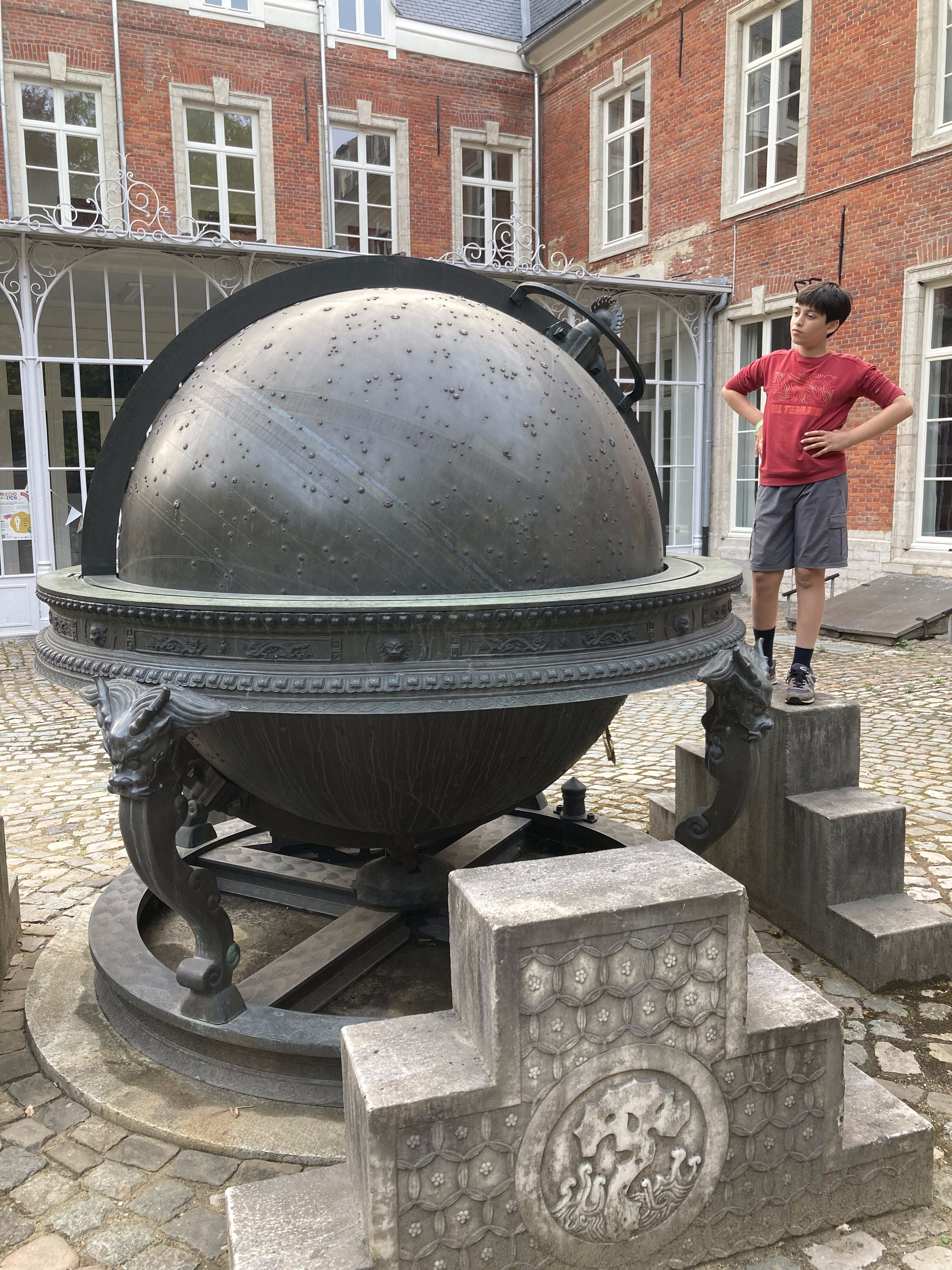
Copy of Verbiest's celestial sphere on display at the Ferdinand Vebiest Institute of the Katholieke Universiteit Leuven

- Ecliptic armilla, armillary sphere, six feet in diameter, used to measure the ecliptic longitude difference and latitudes of celestial bodies. This was the traditional European device while the Chinese had developed the equatorial armilla.
- Equatorial armilla, armillary sphere, six feet in diameter, used primarily for measuring true solar time as well as right ascension difference and declination of celestial bodies.
- Quadrant Altazimuth, six feet in radius, for measuring altitudes or zenith distances of celestial bodies.
- Sextant, eight feet in radius, used to measure the angle of elevation of a celestial object above the horizon. It is used to calculate the angle between two objects, although it is limited to 60 degrees of arc. In navigation, it is used to take a measure of the angle of the Sun at noon to determine latitude.

These instruments were all very large, made of brass and highly decorated, with bronze dragons forming the supports. Despite their weight, they were very easy to manipulate, demonstrating Verbiest's aptitude for mechanical design.

== Final days and death ==
Verbiest died in Beijing shortly after receiving a wound from falling off a bolting horse. He was succeeded as the chief mathematician and astronomer of the Chinese empire by another Belgian Jesuit, Antoine Thomas (1644–1709). He was buried in the Jesuits' Zhalan Cemetery in Beijing, near those of other Jesuits including Matteo Ricci and Johann Adam Schall von Bell, on 11 March 1688.

Verbiest was the only Westerner in Chinese history to ever receive the honour of a posthumous name by the Emperor.

== Verbiest's "car" ==
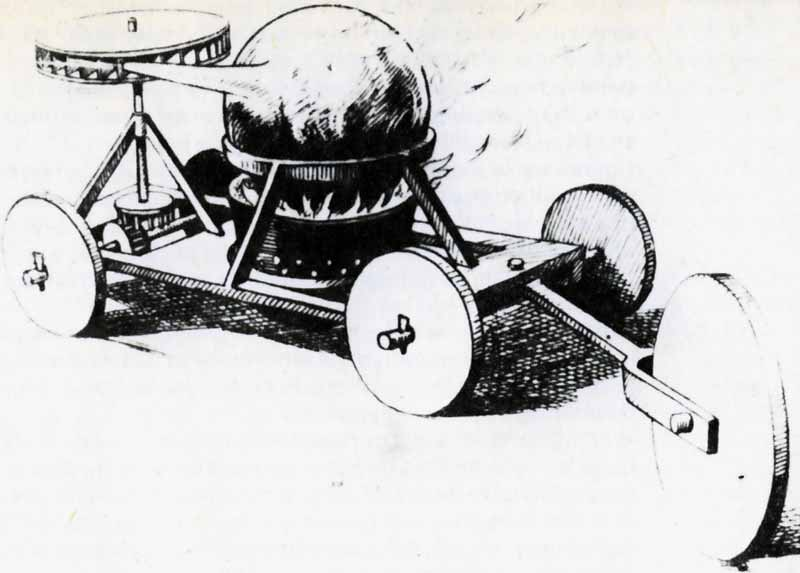
The steam 'car' designed by Verbiest in 1672 – from an 18th-century print

Besides his work in astronomy, Verbiest also experimented with steam. Around 1672, he designed – as a toy for the Kangxi Emperor – a steam-propelled trolley which was, quite possibly, the first working steam-powered vehicle ("auto-mobile"). Verbiest describes it in his manuscript Astronomia Europea that was finished in 1681. A friar brought it to Europe and it was then printed in 1687 in Germany. In this work, Verbiest first mentioned the (Latin) term motor in its present meaning. With one filling of coal, he wrote that the vehicle was able to move more than one hour. As it was only 65 cm (25.6 in) long, and therefore effectively a scale model, not designed to carry human passengers, nor a driver or goods, it is not strictly accurate to call it a 'car'. Despite this, it was the first vehicle that was able to move by 'self-made' engine power.

Since the steam engine was still not known at that time, Verbiest used the principle of an impulse turbine. Steam was generated in a ball-shaped boiler, emerging through a pipe at the top, from where it was directed at a simple, open "steam turbine" (rather like a water wheel) that drove the rear wheels.

It is not verified by other known sources if Verbiest's model was ever built at the time and no authentic drawing of it exists, although he had access to China's finest metal-working craftsmen who were constructing precision astronomical instruments for him.

Students of the Technische Hochschule Ingolstadt in 2021 built an original model according to the description in the Astronomia Europea. Only design options that were feasible at the time were considered (apart from the steam tank, which for safety reason had a pressure valve). The pressure tank was heated with coal and travelled several metres. The replica demonstrated that the concept was technically feasible. A model of this first ‘Auto Mobile’ is on display at the Autoworld Museum in Brussels.

=== The Brumm model ===
The Italian model manufacturer Brumm produced a non-working 1:43 scale model of the Veicolo a turbina de Verbiest (1681) [sic], in their "Old Fire" range of 2002. This model was 9 cm (3.54 in) long, which, when scaled-up, would have suggested that Verbiest's original would have been nearly 4 metres (13 ft 1 in) in length.

However, comparison with drawings in Hardenberg's study shows that this model is not the same as Verbiest's. It is actually modelled on a small steam turbine car built in the late 18th century (presumably 1775) by a German mechanic that was inspired by Verbiest's vehicle but different, for example, only with three wheels. Unfortunately, the original was probably destroyed during a bombing raid on the Technische Hochschule Karlsruhe during World War II. However, a photo of the original car can be seen at the Deutsches Museum. Hardenberg notes that this steam turbine car operated on the same principle as Verbiest's carriage (the impulse turbine), but employed a more modern arrangement of the drive train.

== Major works ==
In Chinese

- 仪象志 (Yixiang zhi), 1673 (on astronomical instruments and apparatus)
- 康熙永年历法 (Kangxi yongnian lifa), 1678 (on the calendar of the Kangxi Emperor)
- 方言教要序论 (Jiaoyao xulun) (explanation of the basics of the faith)

Latin

- Astronomia Europea, 1687
- Postulata Vice-Provinciae Sinensis in Urbe Proponenda

== Memorials ==
Verbiest is commemorated on several postage stamps. One, featuring his face, was issued in Belgium on 24 October 1988, to mark the tri-centenary of his death, with a matching pictorial cancellation postmark. Several more stamps were issued in Macau, in 1989 and 1999, featuring a sketch by Verbiest of the Observatory in Peking, where he worked. The Chevalier Medal for Oriental Art was instituted in his memory to reward exceptional contributions to the sciences and arts.

== See also ==
- Christianity in China
- History of steam road vehicles
- Jesuit China missions
- List of Roman Catholic scientist-clerics
- Religion in China
- Roman Catholicism in China
