= Michael Goblet d'Alviella =

Belgian politician

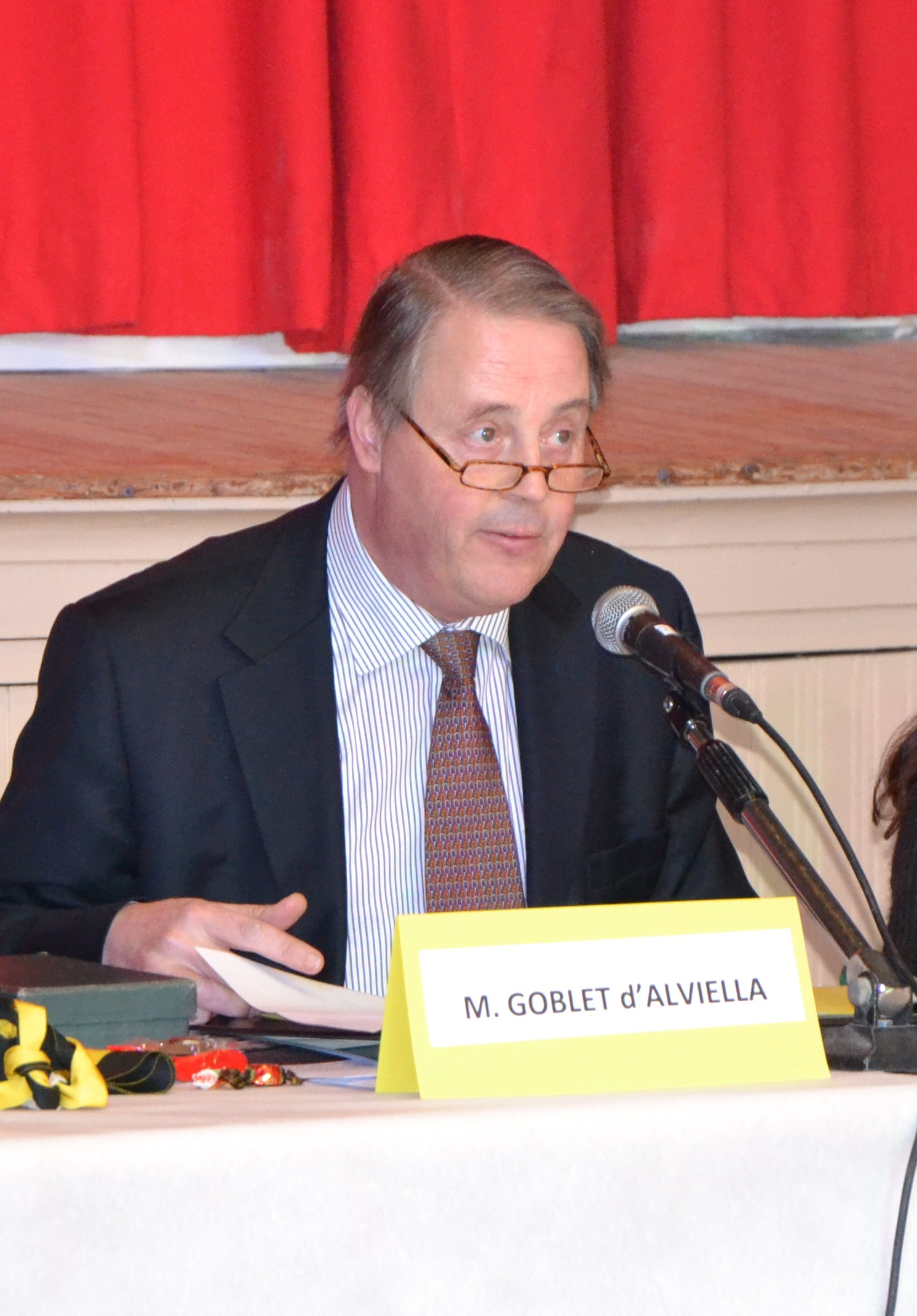
Michael Goblet in 2012

Count Michael Goblet d'Alviella is a Belgian liberal politician, counsel-general, and mayor of Court-Saint-Étienne. He is a son of Jean Goblet d'Alviella and his wife, June Dierdre Corfield. He is the grandson of Sir Conrad Laurence Corfield.
