= Marion Wadsworth Cannon =

American writer

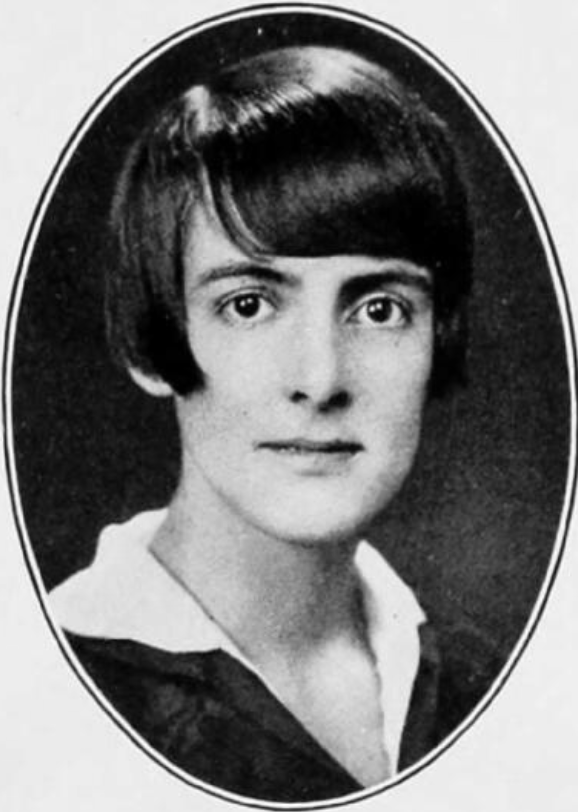
- Marion Wadsworth Cannon, from the 1928 yearbook of Barnard College
- Born: Marion Babette Wadsworth; November 4, 1905; Charlotte, North Carolina, U.S.
- Died: May 29, 1996 (aged 90); Charlotte, North Carolina, U.S.
- Other name: Marion Cannon
- Occupations: Writer, poet
- Relatives: Dannie Heineman (relative); Jefferson Chapman (son-in-law)

Marion Babette Wadsworth Cannon (November 4, 1905 – May 29, 1996) was an American poet and civil rights activist in North Carolina.

== Early life and education ==
Wadsworth was born in Charlotte, North Carolina, the daughter of Charles Franklin Wadsworth and Sarah (Sadie) James Hirshinger Wadsworth. Her mother's family was Jewish; businessman and philanthropist Dannie Heineman was a relative. Her father died by suicide in 1909. Her mother, a former teacher, remarried to Edmund Pendleton Coles in 1914. She graduated from Barnard College in 1927; she was president of her class, editor of the college yearbook, and a member of Phi Beta Kappa.

== Career ==
In college, Wadsworth wrote a play, Hagar and Ishmael, which was produced at Barnard in 1925. During World War II she worked for the American Red Cross in Charlotte.

Cannon was a civil rights activist in Charlotte in the 1950s and 1960s. She served on an interracial committee at the YWCA, and joined in protests and boycotts. She held seats on the boards of Johnson C. Smith University and Barber-Scotia College, and was a life member of the NAACP beginning in 1959. She helped found the Amnesty International chapter in Charlotte. She was named Citizen of the Year at Johnson C. Smith University in 1962, and awarded an honorary doctorate by St. Augustine's College in 1966. In 1985, she was one of the first recipients of the Dr. Martin Luther King, Jr. Annual Medallion Award, given by the City of Charlotte.

In widowhood, Cannon briefly ran a business, Services Unlimited. Late in life, she took creative writing classes, and began publishing her poetry, which was collected in three books. She received the Roanoke-Chowan Award for her first book of poems, Another Light (1974).

== Publications ==
- Another Light (1974), including "Inheritance"
- Second Wind: New Poems (1977)
- Collected Poems (1980)

== Personal life ==
Wadsworth married her second cousin, Martin Luther Cannon Jr., in 1936; in keeping with her unique style, she wore a black and white tweed suit at her wedding. They had a daughter, Carol, who married archaeologist Jefferson Chapman in 1965. Martin L. Cannon died in 1957, and Carol Chapman died from colon cancer in 1985.

Marion Cannon listed her religious affiliation as "druid", and described herself as a witch in her later years. She listed her hobbies as needlepoint and smoking in a 1983 profile. She spent winters on Captiva Island for many years. She died in 1996, at the age of 90, after several years in a Charlotte nursing home with "severe dementia".
