= Pittem =

- Municipality
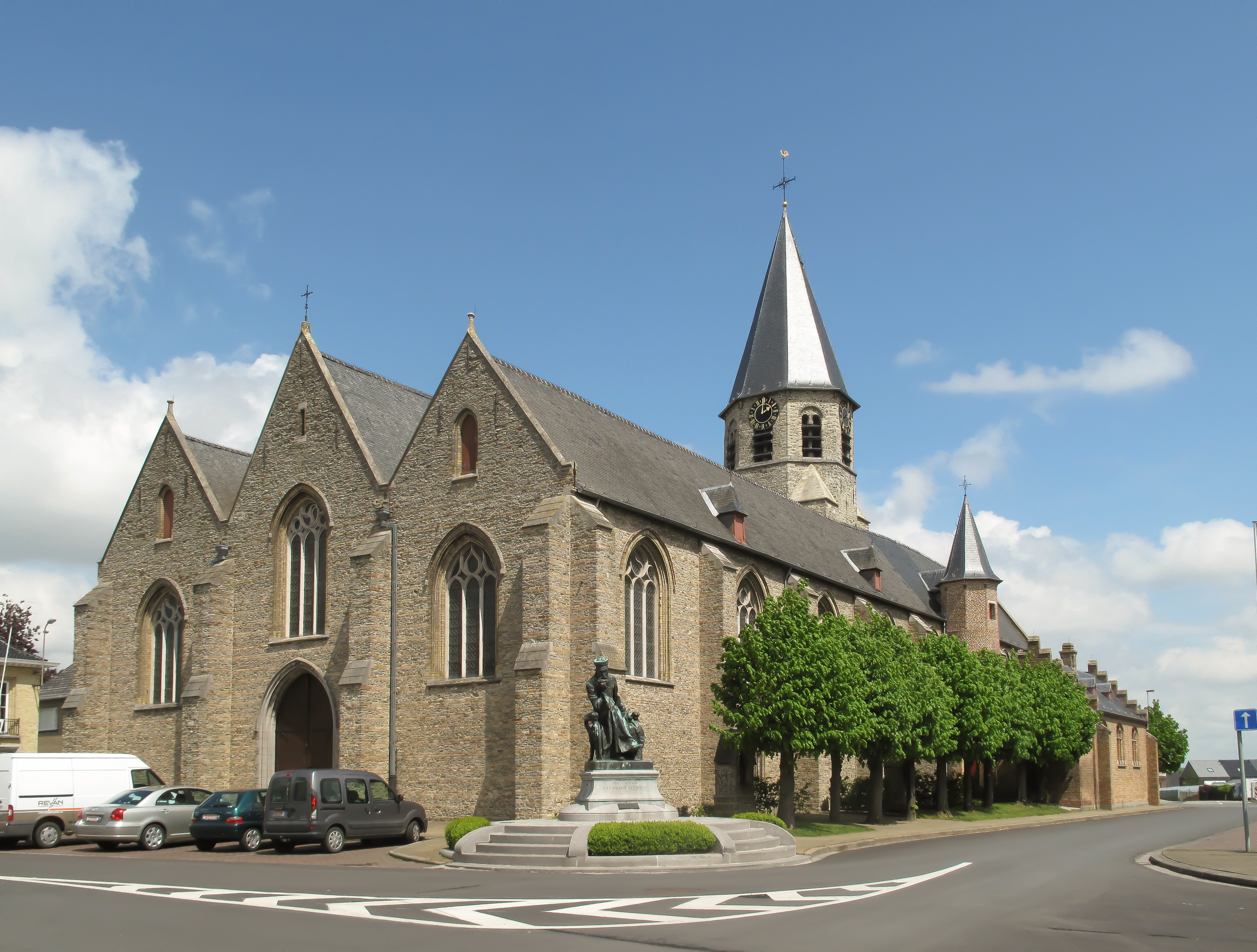
- Pittem, church: Onze Lieve Vrouwkerk

- Flag Coat of arms

- Location of Pittem in West Flanders
- Interactive map of Pittem
- Location in Belgium
- Coordinates: 50°59′N 03°16′E
- Country: Belgium
- Community: Flemish Community
- Region: Flemish Region
- Province: West Flanders
- Arrondissement: Tielt

Government
  - Mayor: Denis Fraeyman (CD&V)
  - Governing party: CD&V

Area
  - Total: 34.69 km^{2} (13.39 sq mi)

Population (2018-01-01)
  - Total: 6,752
  - Density: 194.6/km^{2} (504.1/sq mi)
- Postal codes: 8740
- NIS code: 37011
- Area codes: 051
- Website: www.pittem.be

Pittem (Dutch pronunciation: [ˈpɪtəm], West Flemish: [ˈpɛtəm]) is a municipality located in the Belgian province of West Flanders. The municipality comprises the towns of Egem and Pittem. Pittem has a population of more than 6,900. The total area is 34.42 km^{2} which gives a population density of 192 inhabitants per km².

== Notable people ==
- Ferdinand Verbiest (1623–1688), scientist and missionary
- Félix de Muelenaere (1793-1862), politician; first prime minister of Belgium (1831-1832)
- Rodolphe Poma (1884–1954), Olympic rower
- May Claerhout (1939–2016), artist sculptor
