= Jefferson Chapman =

American archaeologist

Jefferson Chapman (born 1943) is an archaeologist who conducted extensive excavations at sites in eastern Tennessee, recovering evidence that provided the first secure radiocarbon chronology for Early and Middle Archaic period assemblages in Eastern North America. He also is a research professor in anthropology and the Director of the Frank H. McClung Museum at the University of Tennessee, Knoxville. Chapman’s professional interests include Southeastern archaeology, paleoethnobotany, museology and public archaeology.

== Background ==
Chapman was born in Kinston, North Carolina, on March 13, 1943. He received his Bachelor of Arts in anthropology from Yale University in 1965 and an M.A.T. in history and education from Brown University in 1968. Chapman completed a master's degree in anthropology in 1973 and a Ph.D. in anthropology in 1975 from the University of North Carolina. He has conducted archaeology studies for over 40 years and has written twenty books, dozens of journal articles and many other technical publications. He married Carol Cannon, daughter of poet Marion Wadsworth Cannon, in 1965; they had two daughters. Carol died in 1985, from colon cancer.

== Employment history ==
Chapman began his career as a teacher at the Webb School of Knoxville (1965–1967) and was later promoted to be the chairman of the social studies department (1968–1971). Since 1984, he has been a research associate professor and, from 1990 to 2019, was the director of the Frank H. McClung Museum at the University of Tennessee Knoxville. Since 1959, Chapman has also worked as an archaeologist.

== Archaeological excavations ==
Chapman has participated in numerous archaeological excavations in Tennessee including work on the Barkley Reservoir (1959, 1962), Melton Hill Reservoir (1960–1961) and the Tellico Reservoir (1970–1981). Research in the Tennessee River Valley has documented a Native American presence over the last 12,000 years.

Work at the Icehouse Bottom site (1970–1971 and 1975) uncovered the best evidence for early cultivation of maize in eastern North America. Other fieldworks Chapman led or participated in are the Howard Site, the Bacon Bend Site, Iddins Rose Island, Kimberly-Clark site (1989), and the Calloway Island site.

== Awards and honors ==
In 1987, Chapman was made an Honorary Fellow of the Lower Mississippi Survey, Peabody Museum of Archaeology and Ethnology. In 1991, Webb School of Knoxville awarded him its Distinguished Alumnus Award. He was awarded the Robert Webb Distinguished Award in 2002. In 2006, the Tennessee Friends of Sequoyah awarded him with the Sequoyah Excellence Award.

== Research emphases ==
Chapman's research concentrates on the material remains in paleoethnobotony, museology and public archaeology in the southeast United States and Americas.

== Selected books and monographs ==
- Chapman, Jefferson. 1973. "The Icehouse Bottom Site—40MR23". University of Tennessee, Department of Anthropology, Report of Investigations No. 13.
- Chapman, Jefferson 1975. "The Rose Island Site and the Bifurcate Point Tradition". University of Tennessee, Department of Anthropology, Report of Investigations No. 14.
- Chapman, Jefferson 1977." Archaic Period Research in the Lower Little Tennessee River Valley - 1975. Icehouse Bottom, Harrison Branch, Thirty Acre Island, Calloway Island". University of Tennessee, Department of Anthropology, Report of Investigations No. 18.
- Chapman, Jefferson 1978. "The Bacon Farm Site and a Buried Site Reconnaissance". University of Tennessee, Department of Anthropology, Report of Investigations No. 23 and Tennessee Valley Authority, Publications in Anthropology No. 21.
- Chapman, Jefferson 1979. "Archaeological Investigations at the Howard (40MR66) and Calloway Island (40MR41) Sites". University of Tennessee, Department of Anthropology, Report of Investigations No. 27 and Tennessee Valley Authority, Publications in Anthropology No. 23.
- Chapman, Jefferson (Editor). 1980. "The 1979 Archaeological and Geological Investigations in Tellico Reservoir". University of Tennessee, Department of Anthropology, Report of Investigations No. 29 and Tennessee Valley Authority, Publications in Anthropology No. 24.
- Chapman, Jefferson. 1980. "Introduction; Chert Outcrop: 40MR22; Chert Outcrop: 40MR45; Wear Bend Site; Jones Ferry Site". In the 1979 Archaeological and Geological Investigations in Tellico Reservoir, edited by Jefferson Chapman, pp. 1–58. University of Tennessee, Department of Anthropology, Report of Investigations No. 29 and Tennessee Valley Authority, Publications in Anthropology No. 24, pp. 1–58.
- Chapman, Jefferson. 1981. "The Bacon Bend and Iddins sites: The Late Archaic Period in the Lower Little Tennessee River Valley". University of Tennessee, Department of Anthropology, Report of Investigations No. 31 and Tennessee Valley Authority, Publications in Anthropology No. 25.
- Chapman, Jefferson. 1982. The American Indian in Tennessee: An Archaeological Perspective. The Frank H. McClung Museum, The University of Tennessee, Knoxville.
- Russ, Kurt C. and Jefferson Chapman 1983. "Archaeological Investigations at the 18th Century Overhill Cherokee Town of Mialoquo". The University of Tennessee, Department of Anthropology, Report of Investigations No. 37 and Tennessee Valley Authority, Publications in Anthropology No. 36.
- Chapman, Jefferson. 1985. "Tellico Archaeology: 12,000 Years of Native American History". Report of Investigations No. 43, Department of Anthropology, University of Tennessee, Knoxville, Occasional Paper No. 5, Frank H. McClung Museum, and Publications in Anthropology No. 41, Tennessee Valley Authority.
- Chapman, Jefferson. 1988. "The Archaeological Collections at the Frank H. McClung Museum". McClung Museum Occasional Papers No. 7.
- Chapman, Jefferson. 1990. "The Kimberly-Clark Site and Site 40LD207". Tennessee Anthropological Association Miscellaneous Paper No. 14.
- Chapman, Jefferson. 1995. Tellico Archaeology: 12,000 Years of Native American History. Revised Edition. The University of Tennessee Press, Knoxville

== Selected papers ==
- Chapman, Jefferson. 1972. "Hopewell Elements in the Lower Valley of the Little Tennessee River". Proceedings of the 28th Southeastern Archeological Conference, Bulletin 15:11-20.
- Chapman, Jefferson. 1976. "The Archaic Period in the Lower Little Tennessee River Valley: The Radiocarbon Dates". Tennessee Anthropologist 1:1-12.
- Chapman, Jefferson. 1976. "Early Archaic Site Location and Excavation in the Little Tennessee River Valley: Backhoes and Trowels". Southeastern Archaeological Conference, Bulletin 19:31-36.
- Chapman, Jefferson 1979. "Tellico Archaeological Project - 1977". Tennessee Anthropological Association Newsletter 3(2):3-4.
- Chapman, Jefferson. 1984. "A Buried Site Reconnaissance in the Tellico Reservoir, Eastern Tennessee". National Geographic Society Research Reports 17:273-280.
- Chapman, Jefferson. (1985) "Archaeology and the Archaic Period in the Southern Ridge and Valley Province". In Structure and Process in Southeastern Archaeology, edited by Roy S. Dickens and H. Trawick Ward, pp. 137–153. The University of Alabama Press.
- Chapman, Jefferson. 2009. "The Icehouse Bottom Site". In Archaeology in America, An Encyclopedia, Volume 1, general editor Francis P. McManamon, pp. 265–268.
- Chapman, Jefferson and James Adovasio. 1977. "Textile and Basketry Impression from Icehouse Bottom, Tennessee". American Antiquity 42:620-625.
- Chapman, Jefferson and Bennie C. Keel. 1979. "Candy Creek-Connestee Components in Eastern Tennessee and Western North Carolina and Their Relationship with Adena-Hopewell". In Hopewell Archaeology: The Chillicothe Conference, edited by David S. Brose and N'omi Greber, pp. 157–161. The Kent State University Press.
- Chapman, Jefferson and Andrea Brewer Shea. 1981. "The Archaeobotanical Record: Early Archaic Period to Contact in the Lower Little Tennessee River Valley". Tennessee Anthropologist 6:62-84.
- Chapman, Jefferson and Gary D. Crites. 1987. "Evidence for Early Maize (Zea mays) from the Icehouse Bottom Site, Tennessee". American Antiquity 52:352-354.
- Chapman, Jefferson. 1988. "Chota-Tanasee" (p. 96), "Chucalissa" (p. 97), "Eva" (p. 157), "Hiwassee Island" (pp. 208–209), "Icehouse Bottom" (p. 223), "Old Stone Fort" (p. 347), "Pinson" (p. 374). In Historical Dictionary of North American Archaeology, edited by Edward B. Jelks and Juliet C. Jelks. Greenwood Press, New York.
- Chapman, Jefferson. 1988. "The Federal Archeological Program in Tennessee, 1966-1986: An Archeological Second Coming". In Advances in Southeastern Archeology 1966-1986: Contributions of the Federal Archeological Program, edited by Bennie C. Keel, pp. 46–52. Southeastern Archaeological Conference, Special Publication, No. 6.
- Chapman, Jefferson and Sue Myster. 1991. "The Kimberly-Clark Site: A Late Archaic Cremation Cemetery". In The Archaic Period in the Mid-South, edited by Charles H. McNutt, pp. 35–39. Occasional Papers No. 16, Memphis State University.
- Chapman, Jefferson and Patty Jo Watson. 1993. "The Archaic Period and the Flotation Revolution". In Foraging and Farming in the Eastern Woodlands, edited by C. Margaret Scarry. University Presses of Florida, Gainesville.
- Chapman, Jefferson. 1998. "Bifurcate Tradition, Doerschuk Site, Hardaway Site, and Tellico Archaeology". In Archaeology of Prehistoric Native America, An Encyclopedia, edited by Guy Gibbon. Garland Publishing, Inc. New York
- Sherwood, Sarah C. and Jefferson Chapman. 2005. "The Identification and Potential Significance of Early Holocene Prepared Clay Surfaces: Examples from Dust Cave and Icehouse Bottom". Southeastern Archaeology 24(1):70-82.
- Chapman, Jefferson. Hazel R. Delcourt, and Paul A Delcourt (1989) "Strawberry Fields, Almost Forever". Natural History 9(89):50-59.
- Chapman, Jefferson. 2003. "Prehistoric Native American Art in Tennessee". In Art of Tennessee. Frist Center for the Visual Arts, Nashville.
- Chapman, Jefferson. 2009. "Prehistoric American Indians in Tennessee". Research Notes #27. On line publication Frank H. McClung Museum and the Tennessee State Museum.
