= Albert Joseph Goblet d'Alviella =

Belgian politician (1790-1873)

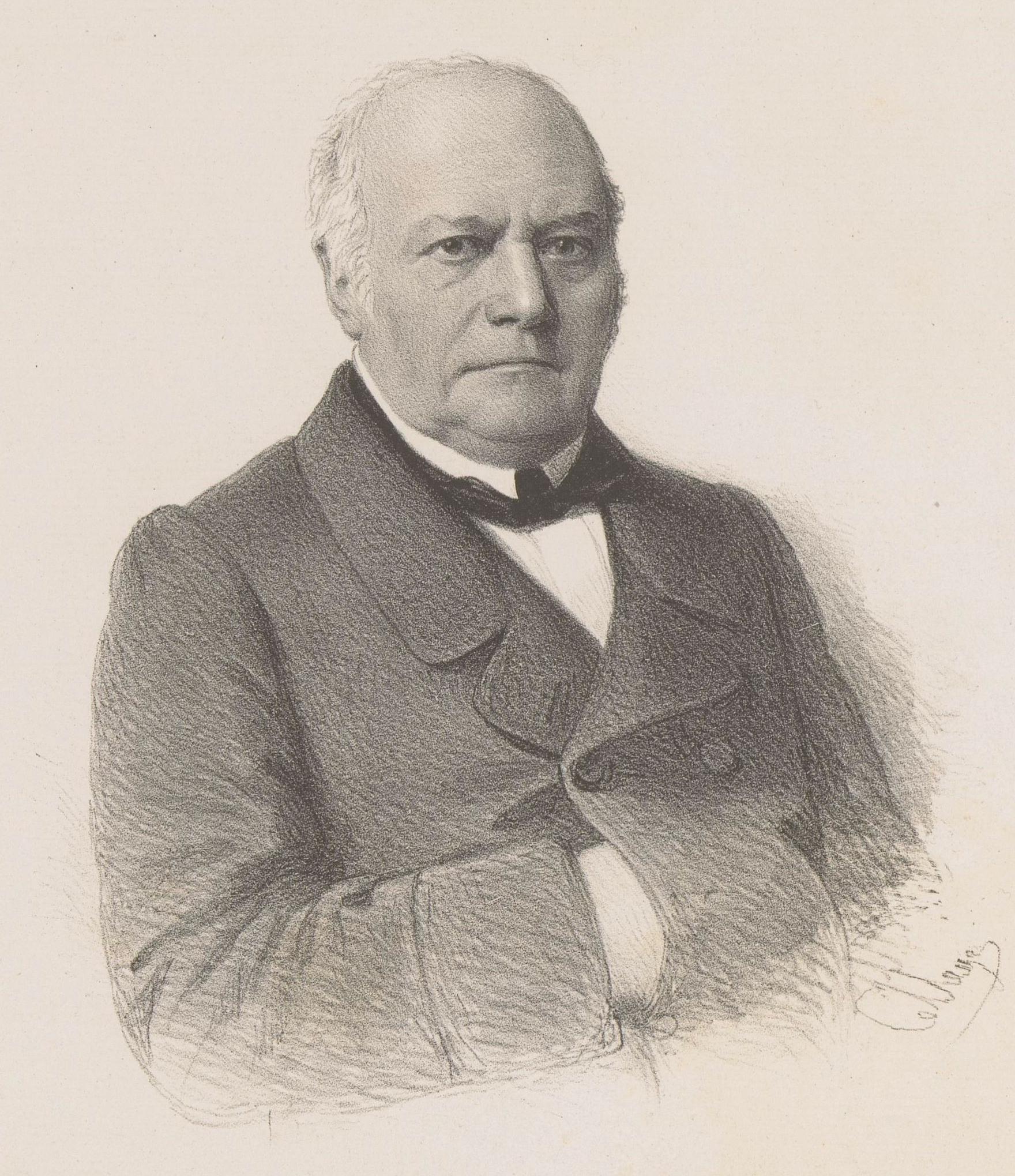

Prime Minister of Belgium
- In office 20 October 1832 – 4 August 1834
- Monarch: Leopold I
- Preceded by: Felix de Muelenaere
- Succeeded by: Barthélémy de Theux de Meylandt

Personal details
- Born: 26 May 1790 Tournai, Austrian Netherlands (now Belgium)
- Died: 5 May 1873 (aged 82) Brussels, Belgium
- Party: Liberal Party

Albert Joseph, Count Goblet d'Alviella (26 May 1790 – 5 May 1873) was an officer in the army of the United Kingdom of the Netherlands. After the Belgian Revolution, he became a politician and served as the prime minister of Belgium.

== Career ==
Born in Tournai, Goblet attended the École spéciale militaire de Saint-Cyr. He became an engineer officer in the French Imperial Army, but joined the Royal Netherlands Army in 1815, rising to the rank of captain.

At the moment of the Belgian insurrection on 16 November 1830, he joined the revolutionary forces, and was given the rank of colonel by the provisional government. He went into politics in the newly independent Belgium, where he became Minister for Foreign Affairs (de facto prime minister) between 1832 and 1834. Though no formal party structures existed at the time, he was considered politically Liberal. He was appointed as inspector-general of the Belgian Army in 1834.

In 1837, he was promoted to the rank of lieutenant general and raised to nobility. He was the grandfather of Eugene Goblet d'Alviella, a famous historian.

He died in Brussels aged 82 in 1873.

== See also ==
- Eugène Goblet d'Alviella
- Félix Goblet d'Alviella
- List of defence ministers of Belgium

Political offices
Preceded by Felix de Muelenaere	Prime Minister of Belgium; 1832–1834	Succeeded by Barthélémy de Theux de Meylandt
