= Félix Goblet d'Alviella =

Belgian fencer and lawyer

Personal information
- Born: 26 May 1884 Ixelles, Belgium
- Died: 2 July 1957 (aged 73) Brussels, Belgium

Sport
- Sport: Fencing
Medal record
Men's fencing
Representing Belgium
Olympic Games
Silver medal – second place	1920 Antwerp	Épée, team

Félix, Count Goblet d'Alviella (26 May 1884 – 7 February 1957) was a Belgian lawyer, director of the Revue de Belgique, alderman and Olympic fencer. He was married to Eva Boël (1883–1956), and was the father of Jean Goblet d'Alviella. He was a son of Eugene Goblet d'Alviella.

He won a silver medal in the team épée competition at the 1920 Summer Olympics.

== Notes ==
- D'Hoore, M., Archives de particuliers relatives à l’histoire de la Belgique contemporaine (de 1830 à nos jours), Bruxelles, AGR, 1998, 2 vol., p. 381.
- Le Livre Bleu. Recueil biographique, Brussel, Maison Ferd. Larcier, 1950, p. 245.
