= Eugène Goblet d'Alviella =

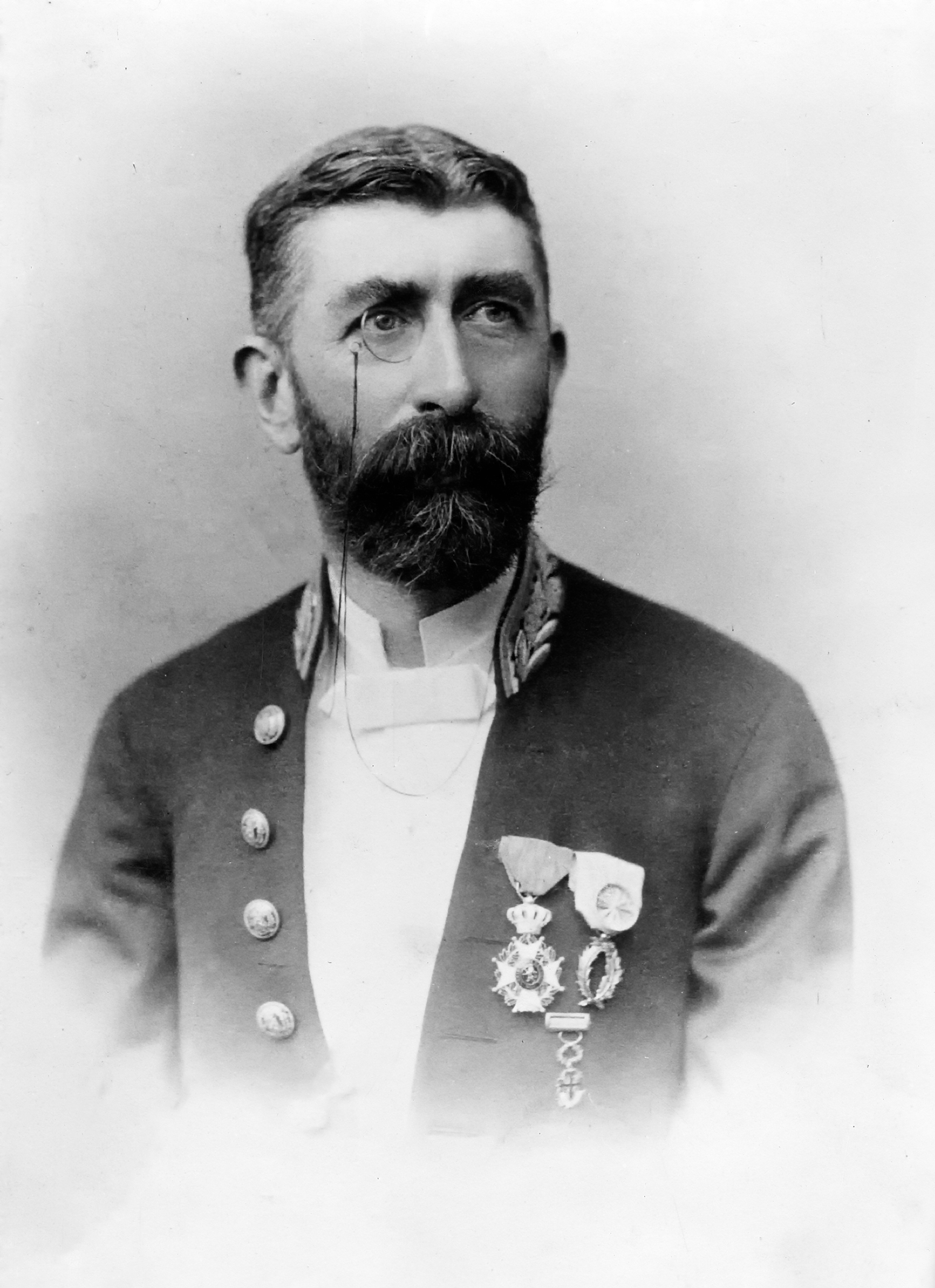
- Eugene Goblet d'Alviella
- Born: Eugène Félicien Albert; 10 August 1846; Ixelles, Belgium
- Died: 9 September 1925 (aged 79); Ixelles, Belgium
- Occupations: politician, lawyer, academic

Eugène Félicien Albert, Count Goblet d'Alviella (10 August 1846 – 9 September 1925) was a lawyer, liberal senator of Belgium and a Professor of the history of religions and rector of the Universite Libre de Bruxelles (ULB). He was the father of Félix Goblet d'Alviella, a lawyer and director of the Revue de Belgique.

He became famous for this book The Migration of Symbols, which is one of the foundations of religious archeology. He was a freemason, a member of the lodge Les Amis Philanthropes (initiated in 1870), Grand Master of the Grand Orient of Belgium (1884), and Grand Commander of the Supreme Council in 1900.

Coat of arms

== Publications ==
- The Contemporary Evolution of Religious Thought in England (1885)
- Lectures on the origin and growth of the Conception of God as Illustrated by anthropology and history (1892), being the Hibbert lectures delivered by Eugene at Balliol College, Oxford in 1891, although he was refused the use of a room by the college authority for his nonconformist and nonsectarian views on Christian religion and other analogous matters.
- The Migration of Symbols (1894)
- Eleusinia : De quelques problèmes relatifs aux Mystères d’Eleusis (1903)

== Honours ==
- 1919 : Knight Grand Cross in the Order of the Crown.

== See also ==
- Albert Joseph Goblet d'Alviella
