= Dannie Heineman =

Belgian-American engineer and businessman

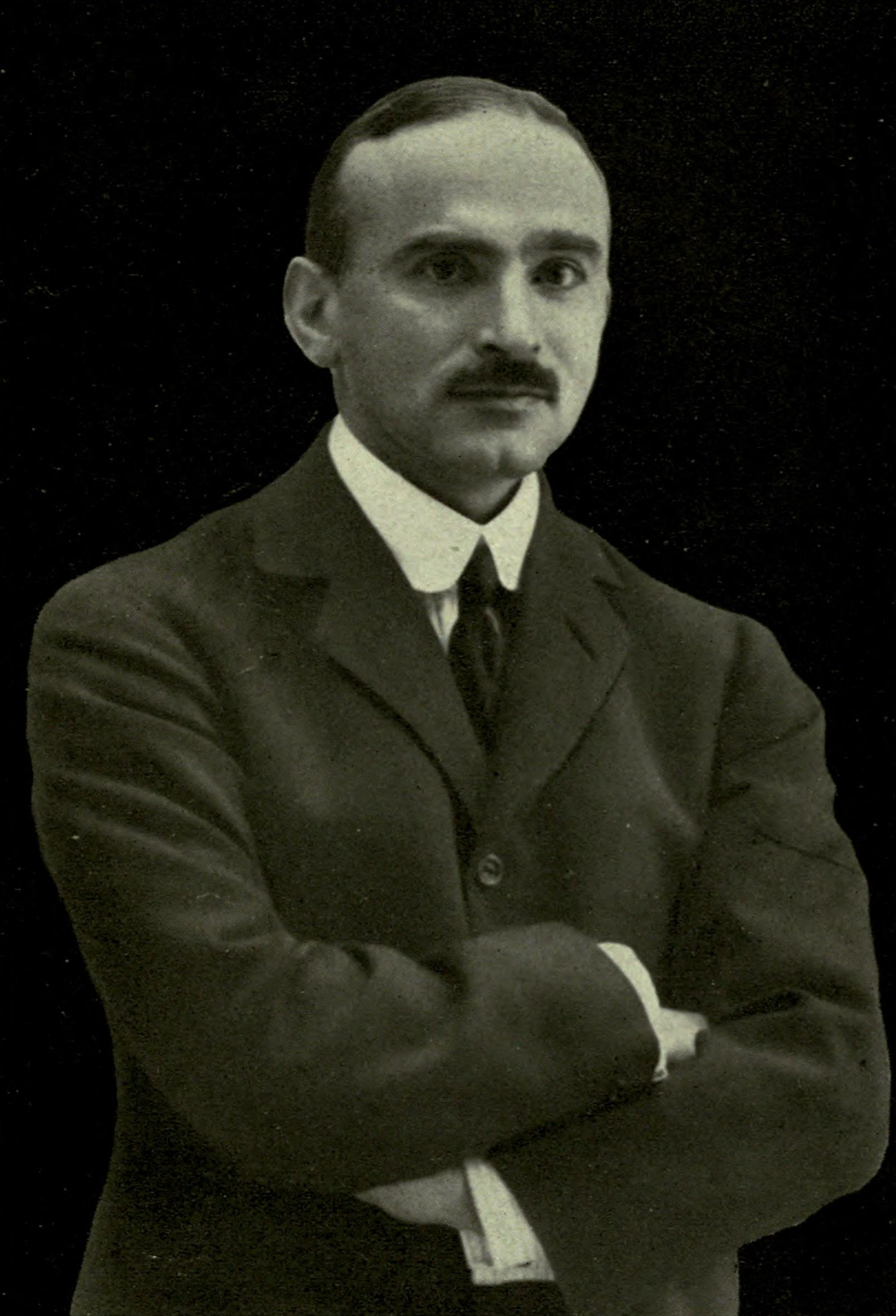
Dannie Heineman

Dannie N. Heineman (23 November 1872 – 31 January 1962) was an American-born engineer and businessman, based in Belgium before 1940. In 1905, he became the managing director of Sofina, which at the time was a small investment trust. He remained the head of Sofina for 50 years, during which Sofina grew into a large international public utility engineering management and holding company. He retired from the position in 1955 at the age of 83.

In 1939, while living in Belgium, Dannie Heineman managed to get the Luxembourg government to open its closed borders and admit approximately 100 Jewish families from Germany. The persuasive argument was that hotels in Luxembourg were empty and he would pay for the rooms and give the Jews an allowance, and they would not be working and taking jobs away from Luxembourg workers. This arrangement worked until 10 May 1940 when Hitler invaded. At that point his assistant Mr. Schmidt made a final six months payment to the families. Among the families was the physicist Ernst Ising who survived the war.

== Personal life ==
Heineman was married to Hettie Meyer and had two sons, James who was a utility executive and Stephen who was a physician. Daughter Marian H. Rose was a physicist and environmental activist.

== Philanthropy ==
He established the Heineman Foundation for Research, Educational, Charitable and Scientific Purposes.

It endowed several prizes in the sciences, including:

- Dannie Heineman Prize of the Göttingen Academy of Sciences and Humanities
- Dannie Heineman Prize for Mathematical Physics
- Dannie Heineman Prize for Astrophysics

The foundation was also active in the arts. In 1959 the foundation also funded the purchase and donation to the Library of Congress books relating to early music history. These include Johannes Tinctoris' historically important book Terminorum musicae diffinitorium, the earliest printed music dictionary, and books of Palestrina motets and Marenzio madrigals.

In 1962, after Heineman's death, the Foundation's music book and manuscript collection was placed on deposit at the Pierpont Morgan Library; the physical transfer to the library was completed in 1977. Notable manuscripts in this collection include:

- Schubert's Erlkönig
- Bruch's Violin Concerto
- Bach's Cantata 197a (Ehre sei Gott in der Höhe)
- Mahler's Das klagende Lied
- Wagner's own annotated copy of the first printing of the libretto for Der Ring des Nibelungen.
