= Conrad Corfield =

British colonial administrator

Sir Conrad Laurence Corfield KCIE, CSI, MC, (15 August 1893 – 3 October 1980), was a British civil servant and the private secretary to several viceroys of India, including Lord Mountbatten. He also was the author of the book The Princely India I Knew, from Reading to Mountbatten.

== Early life and wartime service ==
Corfield was born in Heanor, Derbyshire on 15 August 1893, the son of the Rev. Egerton Corfield, a Church of England missionary and later rector of Finchampstead, Berkshire, in England. He was educated at St. Lawrence College, Ramsgate, where he would later serve as a member of the governing body.

On 8 October 1914, Corfield was commissioned as a second lieutenant in the 1st Cambridgeshire Regiment. During the First World War, he saw active service on the Western Front. He was promoted to the temporary rank of lieutenant on 16 March 1915 (antedated and made substantive from the same date on 4 August 1916), and promoted to the temporary rank of captain on 17 June 1915 (pay and allowances from 12 January 1916).

As a lieutenant (temporary captain), he was decorated with the Military Cross (MC) on 16 November 1916:

For conspicuous gallantry during operations. He set a fine example when consolidating a trench under heavy shell fire. He also brought in a wounded man under broad daylight, and later was himself wounded in carrying out a dangerous patrol.

Corfield was subsequently appointed the adjutant of his battalion, and was promoted to the substantive rank of captain on 29 August 1917 (precedence from 1 June 1916). He relinquished his commission on 1 September 1921.

== Civil service career ==
=== In the British Raj ===
In 1920 Corfield joined a batch of recruits into the Indian Civil Service.

After initial training in the Punjab, in May 1921 Corfield was posted to New Delhi to serve as assistant private secretary to the Viceroy, Lord Reading. After holding this position for eighteen months, he was posted back to the Punjab for district work. In 1925 he was selected to join the Foreign and Political Department of the government of India, and his first appointment was that of Secretary to the Agent for the Western India States Agency.

He was later transferred to the North West Frontier Province as Assistant to the Political Agent in Kalat. At the end of 1928, he was transferred in the same capacity to the Rajputana Agency. Three years later, he was placed in charge of the Political Agency in the Southern States of Central India and Malawa, but was quickly transferred again to Hyderabad State to serve as secretary to the resident in the Nizam's Dominions. In the spring of 1932, he was posted to Rewa to handle administrative issues in the State and was made vice-president of the State Council.

At the close of 1932 he returned to the England to serve as adviser to the Delegation of Rewa at the third session of the Indian Round Table Conference. In 1934, Corfield was appointed joint secretary of the Foreign and Political Department, serving first under Lord Willingdon and later under Lord Linlithgow. In 1938 he became resident in Jaipur, and then in 1940 transferred to the Punjab States in the same capacity. In 1945 Corfield was called up to become political adviser to the Crown Representative, Lord Wavell. In this role, Corfield was the official link between the Viceroy and the Princes of India. When Wavell was called back to England in the spring of 1947, and Mountbatten was installed as viceroy, Corfield continued as the new viceroy's political adviser to the Crown Representatives.

Corfield remained in India until the British transfer of power to the governments of Nehru and Jinnah was completed in August of that year.

==== Views on India ====
Corfield was concerned about the rights of the princes in the independent India. He asserted that the princely states should be allowed to remain independent if they chose to do so. He also sought and received the permission of the British government to destroy four tons of records that had been collected concerning the princes' personal lives. He felt these records could be used by the new government of India as blackmail against the princes due to their often racy and scandalous content.

=== In Britain ===
On returning to Britain, Corfield had several occupations such as governor and vice-president of St Lawrence College, Chairman of Wokingham Division Conservative Association from 1950 to 1954 and chairman of Yateley Industries for Disabled Girls from 1954 to 1964.

== Personal life ==
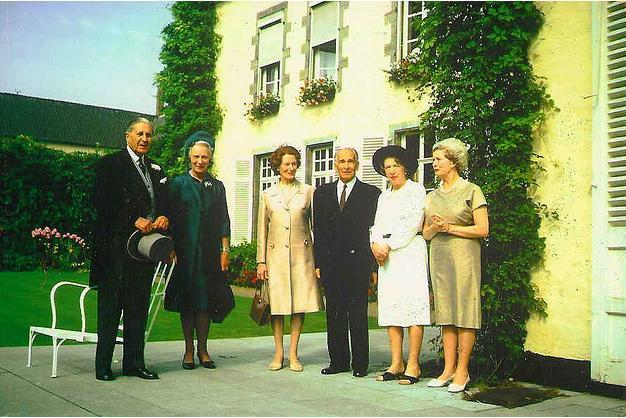
Sir Conrad Corfield (middle) and wife Lady Sylvia in 1971 at the wedding of June Corfield's first son.

Corfield firstly married Phyllis Betha Pugh, the daughter of L. P. E. Pugh, KC on 22 December 1922. The couple had one daughter and a son. After his first wife died in 1932, Corfield remained a widower for several decades until marrying Sylvia Phyllis Mary Hadow, the widow of Lt. Col. Charles O'Brian Daunt, on 16 September 1961.

Sylvia died on 1977 and Corfield died on 3 October 1980 at the Warren Lodge Rest Home, in Finchampstead.

== Decorations ==
Corfield received the following decorations from the British government:

- World War I MC, Military Cross
- 1937 CIE, Companion of the Order of the Indian Empire
- 1942 CSI, Companion of the Order of the Star of India
- 1945 KCIE, Knight Commander of the Order of the Indian Empire
