= Sofina =

Belgian holding company

- Traded as: Euronext Brussels: SOF
- ISIN: ISIN: BE0003717312
- Industry: financial service activities, except insurance and pension funding
- Parent: Trust Financiers de Transports et d'Entreprises Industrielles

Sofina, Société Financière de Transports et d'Entreprises Industrielles, is a Belgian holding company, headquartered in Brussels with offices in Singapore and Luxembourg. As part of the Bel20 index, it is one of the twenty largest capitalisation in Belgium. The company invests in several industrial sectors such as telecommunication (7%), banks and insurance (6%), private equity (6%), B2B (18%), consumer goods (31%), energy (6%), food distribution (8%) and various other sectors (10%). Geographically, Sofina has investments located in Belgium, France, Luxembourg, the Netherlands, the United Kingdom, China, India and North America.

== History ==
The company was founded in 1898. It was led from 1905 until 1955 by the Belgian-American engineer of German origin Dannie Heineman (1872–1962). Historically, the company owned the Anglo-Argentine Tramways Company, which was one of the largest tram operators in the world at the time. From 1955 on, the current family shareholders started to invest. Yves Boël is appointed Director in 1956. In 1964, the Boël family took control together with Société Générale de Belgique.

== Governance, management and shareholder structure ==
=== Governance and Management ===
- Chairman of the board: David Verey since 2014 (took over from Richard Goblet d'Alviella)
- Management: Harold Boël, chief executive officer, Xavier Coirbay, Wauthier De Bassompierre, Francois Gillet. Former Managers : Jean-Luc Reginster, former general counsel, former secretary; Marc Speeckaert, former managing director; Marc Van Cauwenberghe, former deputy managing director.

=== Shareholder structure ===
The majority of the shares are held by the Boël family. The remaining shares are listed on Euronext Brussels and Sofina is part of the Bel 20 index.

== Notable investments ==
- Barcelona Traction
- Bira 91
- ByteDance
- Byju's
- Cambridge Associates
- Cognita
- Colruyt
- Danone
- Eurazeo
- Flipkart (made an exit in 2018)
- Myntra
- Pine Labs
- Richemont
- Sequoia Capital
- SES
- Suez S.A.
- Typeform (service)
- Vinted (service)
- Cerealis

== See also ==
- Groupe Bruxelles Lambert
