= Alphonse Le Roy =

Alphonse Le Roy (French: [alfɔ̃s lə ʁwa]; 28 July 1822, Liège – 2 March 1896, Liège) was a Belgian philosopher and philologist, professor at the University of Liège, who contributed over 150 entries to the Biographie Nationale de Belgique.

== Life ==
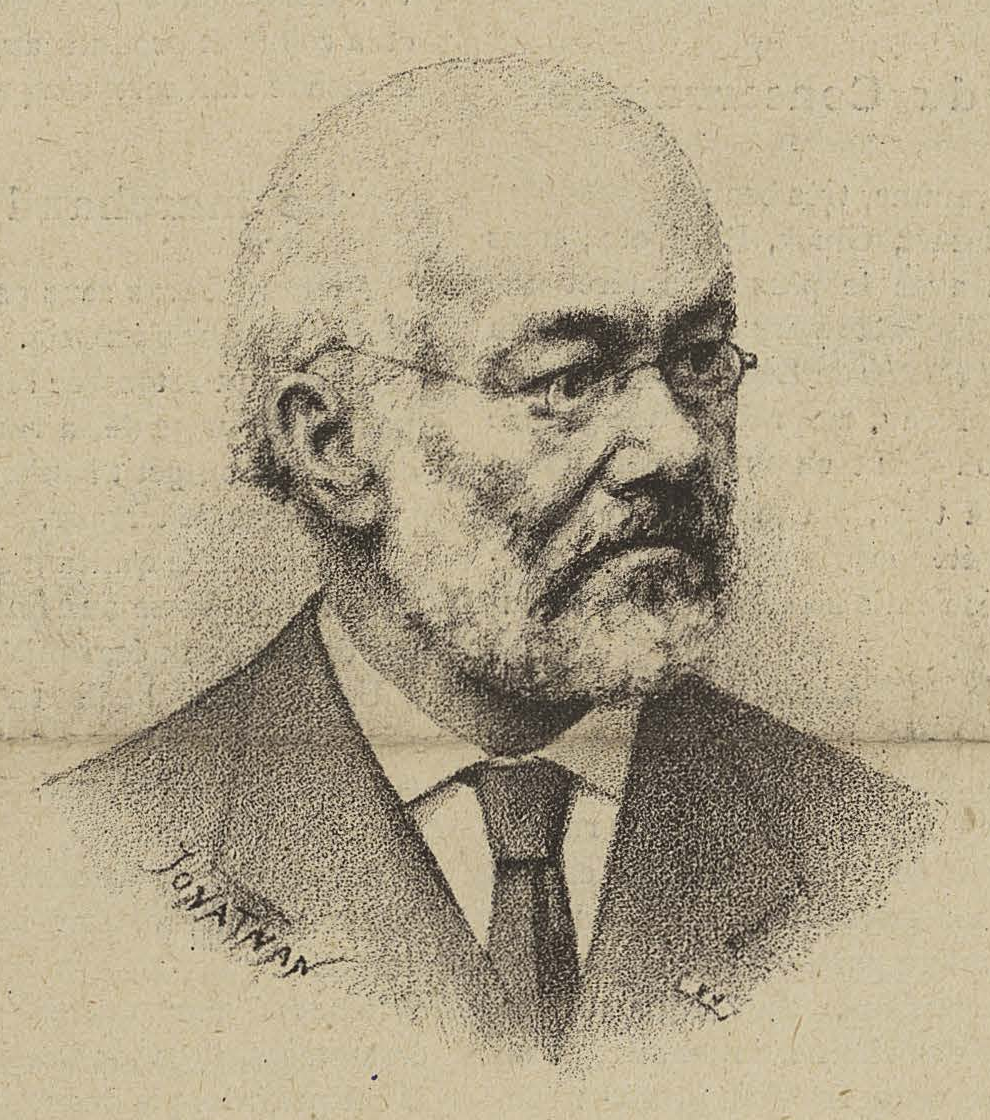
Alphonse Le Roy (by Jonathan a.k.a. Alfred Decelle, in Caprice Revue 1888-01-21)

Le Roy was born in Liège on 28 July 1822, the only son of Louis-Nicolas Le Roy and Henriette Streel. On 12 September 1848, he married Marie-Françoise-Elisa Delvaux (1818-1902).

He first studied philosophy at Liège University, graduating at the age of 19 in 1841, and after abandoning a law degree went on to qualify as a teacher. He taught at a secondary school in Tienen for a number of years from 1844, helping set up the Journal de l'Instruction publique in 1845. This journal talks about the debate of secondary education, particularly in the humanities. This debate led Le Roy to organize a Congress in Brussels in 1848 that gathered every secondary teachers in Belgium. This events and the others that followed led to the creation of a council for the improvement of secondary teaching.

In 1850 he was appointed lecturer on logic and metaphysics at the University of Liège. He was appointed extraordinary professor in 1856, full professor in 1862, and professor emeritus on 23 September 1889. Within the faculty of Philosophy and Letters, he also assumed some responsibilities: he was several times secretary and dean, as well as, secretary of the Academic Council in 1868-1869.

During his career, he taught several class at university:

- Metaphysics (1850-1879)
- Aesthetic (1851-1879)
- Logic (1859-1889)
- Archeology (1866-1875)
- History of ancient and modern philosophy (1873-1889)

He also taught at pedagogy, logic and psychology the Ecole normale des Humanités.

He was elected a corresponding member of the Royal Academy of Science, Letters and Fine Arts of Belgium on 9 May 1870, a full member on 12 May 1873, and president in 1882. He was a member of many other scholarly societies. He died in Liège on 2 March 1896.

Throughout his life, Alphonse Le Roy published a lot of literary works. His research interest were philosophy, public education, archeology and fines-arts. For the University of Liege's fiftieth birthday, in 1869, he wrote Liber Memorialis. L'Université de Liège depuis sa fondation. He also published in a lot of journal and magazine, and contributed over 150 entries to the Biographie Nationale de Belgique.

He also wrote poetry in Walloon, including a collection of songs in Walloon signed F.L.P., which stands for the initials of the three authors Théophile Fuss, Le Roy et Adolphe Picard. With the latter, he also wrote songs, still in Walloon, under the pseudonym Alcide Pryor. His interest for Walloon literature was also carried out the edition of Remacle Maréchal's fables that includes new 26 fables.

He received several honours, including the Order of Leopold in 1869 and Order of the Oak Crown in 1870.

A large amount of Alphonse Le Roy's letters and archives are located at KBR Royal Library of Belgium.

== Works ==
- La philosophie au pays de Liège, XVIIe et XVIIIe siècles (Liège, Paris and Leipzig, 1860)
- Notice sur Eugène Charles Catalan, 1867
- Jean Kinker : sa vie et ses travaux, 1869
- Liber Memorialis: L'Université de Liège depuis sa fondation (Liège, 1869)
- L'administration de l'Instruction publique en France sous le ministère de M. Duruy, Liège, de Thier, 1870
- «Ulysse Capitaine, sa vie & ses travaux », Annuaire de la société liégeoise de littérature wallonne, vol. 7, 1872, p. 43-124
- Fables de R. Maréchal, Liège, de Thier, 1872.
