= Blommaert =

Blommaert is a surname. Notable people with the surname include:

- Abraham Blommaert, (ca 1629-after 1671) Dutch painter from Middelburg
- Jan Blommaert, Flemish linguist
- Philip Blommaert (1809–1871), Flemish writer
- Samuel Blommaert (1583–1651), Dutch merchant
- Susan Blommaert, American actress
