= Paul Bergmann (disambiguation) =

Paul Bergmann (born 1961) is an American former football player.

Paul Bergmann may also refer to:

- Paul Bergmann (politician), German Member of the IV. German Reichstag (Weimar Republic)
- Paul Bergmann, former member of American band Thinking Fellers Union Local 282

== See also ==
- Paul Bergmans (1868–1935), Belgian librarian
