= Alphonse Roersch =

Belgian philologist

Alphonse Roersch (1870–1951) was a Belgian philologist, professor at the University of Ghent.

== Life ==
Roersch was born in Liège on 3 November 1870, and was educated at the Athénée royal de Liège, where he placed first in Latin. He graduated Doctor of Philosophy in 1891 and Candidate of Law in 1892. He studied in Paris (1892-3) and Berlin (1893-4) and began teaching at Ghent University in 1895. He took a particular interest in Latin Humanists, publishing studies of Joannes Loensis (van Loo) and of Nicolas Cleynaerts, and of the history of classical philology in Belgium. In 1907, he was appointed professor in Ghent.

All the articles on humanists published in the Biographie Nationale de Belgique between 1894 and 1938 were his work. He was also a contributor to the bibliographic reference work Bibliotheca belgica. In 1913, after Ferdinand van der Haeghen's death, Roersch and Paul Bergmans jointly took over the editorship of the latter project.

During the First World War, Roersch was active in relief efforts.

He was elected a corresponding member of the Académie Royale de Belgique in 1922, and a full member in 1932. In 1935, he succeeded Henri Pirenne as chair of the board of the Royal Library of Belgium.

He retired in 1944 due to ill health and died in Leuven on 31 July 1951.

== Works ==
- Histoire de l'humanisme belge à l'époque de la Renaissance (2 vols., -1933)
