= Nicolas Defuisseaux =

Belgian lawyer and politician (1802-1893)

Personal details
- Born: Nicolas François Joseph Defuisseaux; 2 February 1802 Mons, Hainaut Province, First French Empire
- Died: 24 November 1857 (aged 55) Baudour, Hainaut Province, Belgium
- Relations: Philippe Joseph Defuisseaux (father); Alfred Defuisseaux (son)
- Occupation: Lawyer
- Awards: Iron Cross; Order of Leopold

Nicolas Defuisseaux (2 February 1802 – 24 November 1857) was a Belgian lawyer, senator, industrialist, and a former commander of the Garde Civique.

== Biography ==
=== Early life and education ===
Nicolas François Joseph Defuisseaux was born in Mons, Hainaut Province, Belgium on 2 February 1802. In 1792, after the Battle of Jemappes during the War of the First Coalition, Philippe Joseph Defuisseaux, his father, played a key role in establishing the French First Republic in the city of Mons.

Nicolas attended the Royal Academy of Sciences and Letters of Brussels in August 1817, winning a prize for his second year of grammar studies.

=== Law ===
After attending the high school of Brussels, he obtained a Doctor of Law degree from Ghent University on 12 August 1825, and soon made a name for himself at the Bar of Mons. He worked as a lawyer in Mons from 1830 to 1845.

During the Belgian Revolution of 1830, he was sent to Borinage, overseeing the first arrests and stopping acts of pillaging. Defuisseaux was appointed by the Provisional Government of Belgium to assist Auguste Harmignie, the government commissioner at the court of Mons, in the investigation of Gen. Juan Van Halen. For his contribution, he was decorated with the Iron Cross in 1831.

=== Political career ===
He was elected as a member of the Provincial Council of Hainaut on 28 May 1838.

Following the Belgian Revolution, Nicolas Defuisseaux was delegated the command of the Civil Guard (French: Garde Civique) in Brussels by an order of 22 June 1838. Defuisseaux filled the functions of commander on an interim basis until a royal decree of 9 September 1848, called François Van Assche.

Defuisseaux was actively involved in the Society of Sciences, Arts and Letters of Hainaut in Mons, serving as president by April 1841. The society's board also included Camille Wins and Camille Joseph Castiaux as vice presidents and Adolphe Mathieu as the secretary. Along with the other members, he delivered a speech at the funeral of Hainaut Governor Jean-Baptiste Thorn in 1841. Defuisseaux served as president for the organization's 1843–1844 term.

Elected to the Hainaut Provincial Council on 23 May 1842, Defuisseaux's term concluded in 1844.

On 25 March 1844, he became a member of the Société des bibliophiles de Belgique.

In 1844, he operated as the lawyer for Firmin Petit, a coal mining manager in Dour with a copper ore concession in Rouveroy and Givry, submitting an application for a concession.

=== Industrialist ===
In the mid-1840s, Defuisseaux partnered with Belgian engineer François Declerc, who had converted a factory in Baudour into a porcelain factory in 1842. After some time, he took over the Porcelain Factory of Baudour (French: Manufacture de Porcelaine de Baudour), expanding production to include refractory products.

On 25 May 1846, he was again reelected to the Provincial Council and served until 1852.

He joined the Exposition des produits de l'industrie belge of 1847, showcasing hard-paste porcelain to Europe. Following his attendance at the Great Exhibition, an international industrial exhibition of 1851, King Leopold I of Belgium appointed him a knight of his order on 22 October 1851.

Defuisseaux joined the Chamber of Representatives in the Senate of Belgium on 8 June 1852 but stepped down in 1854. He dedicated himself to the ceramics factory and the industry's development until his death.

Along with other members of the Society of Sciences, Arts and Letters of Hainaut, he advocated for the establishment of a statue of Orlando di Lasso in one of the public squares in Mons in 1857.

== Death ==
Nicolas Defuisseaux died in Baudour, Belgium on 24 November 1857.

== Works ==
- On Legality, and the Influence of Silence Imposed on the Confined (French: De la légalité, et de l'influence du mutisme imposé aux reclus), 1843
