= Xavier de Theux de Meylandt et Montjardin =

Belgian bibliophile (1838-1896)

Xavier de Theux
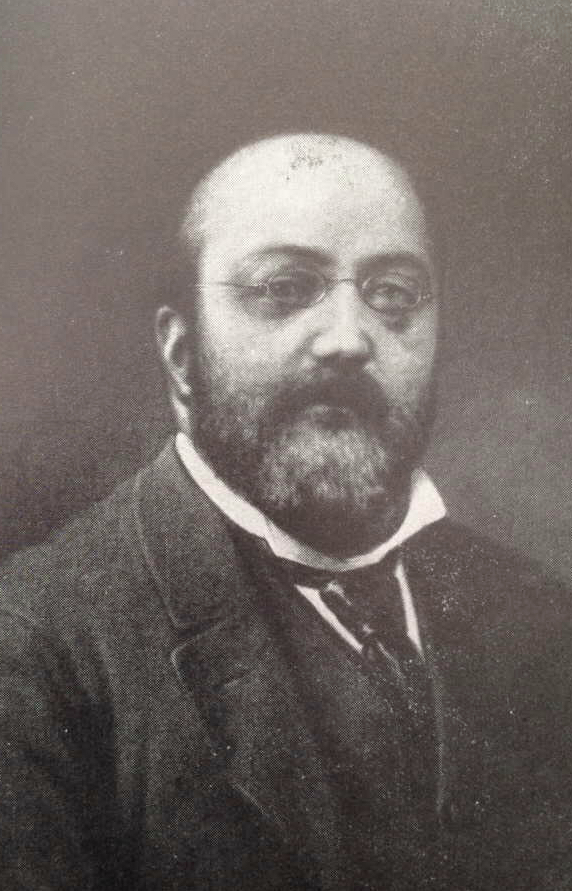
- Born: Xavier Marie Georges Théodore De Theux de Montjardin; 23 September 1838; Sint-Truiden, Limburg, Flemish Region, Belgium
- Died: 13 December 1896 (aged 58); City of Brussels, Belgium

Xavier de Theux or Xavier Marie Georges Théodore De Theux de Montjardin (23 September 1838 — 13 December 1896) was a Belgian bibliophile and president of the Société des bibliophiles de Belgique.

== Biography ==
Xavier Marie Georges Théodore De Theux de Montjardin was born in Sint-Truiden, Limburg, Flemish Region, Belgium on 23 September 1838.

De Theux obtained a Doctorate of Law. He married Eugénie de Thysebaert in Namur on 18 May 1865.

Joining the Liège Bibliophile Society in 1863, he later presided over the Society of Bibliophiles of Belgium (French: Société des bibliophiles de Belgique) in 1865. Xavier de Theux served as president of the society, with Ferdinand Van Der Haeghen as vice president, Gustave Hagemans as treasurer, and Jules Delecourt as secretary.

== Death ==
Xavier de Theux died in Brussels on 13 December 1896.
