= Ferdinand van der Haeghen =

Belgian librarian and bibliophile

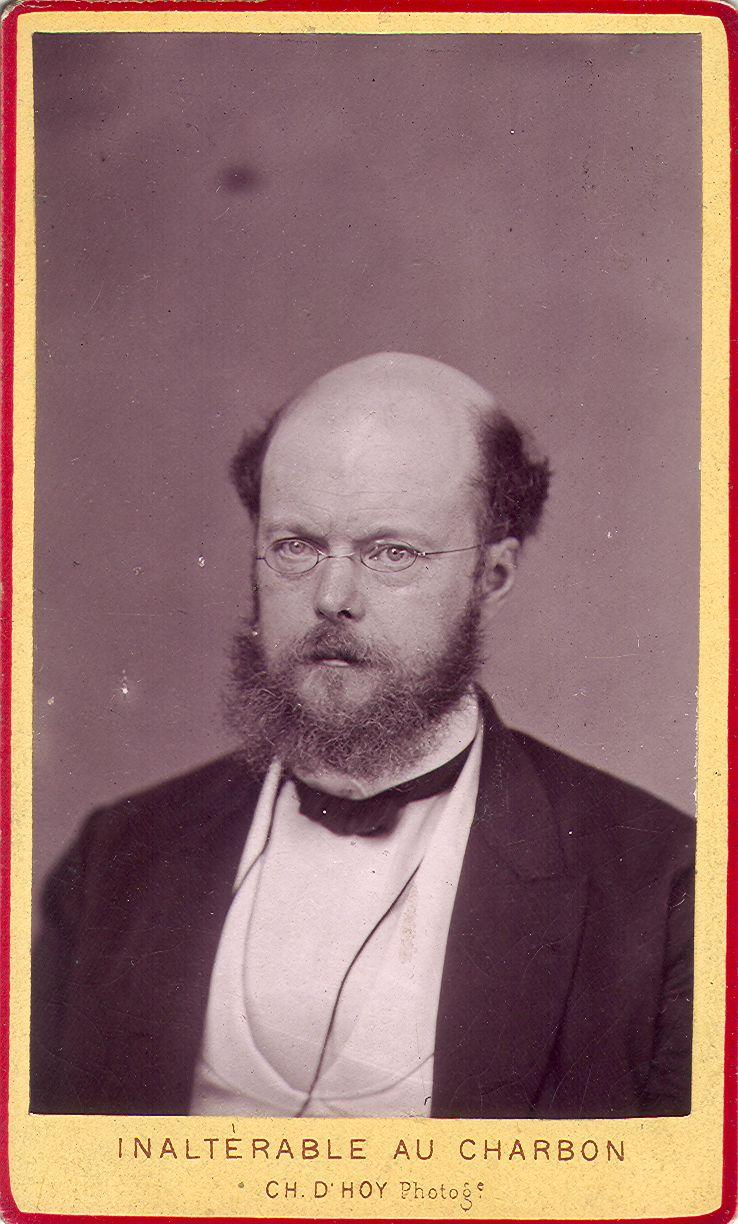

Ferdinand van der Haeghen or Vanderhaeghen (1830–1913) was a Belgian librarian and bibliophile.

== Life ==
Van der Haeghen was born in Ghent on 16 October 1830, the son of Désiré-Jean Van der Haeghen (1797–1850), owner and publisher of the Gazette van Gent (established 1667). He was educated at the Collège Notre-Dame de la Paix in Namur, and spent two years studying at Ghent University without taking a degree. He became university librarian in Ghent.

He was an active member of the Maetschappy der Vlaemsche Bibliophilen and a founding member of the Royal Academy of Dutch Language and Literature (1886). In 1888, he became editorial secretary of the Biographie Nationale de Belgique, overseeing publication of volumes 10 to 20. He was elected a corresponding member of the Royal Academy of Science, Letters and Fine Arts of Belgium in 1888, and a full member in 1891.

Van der Haeghen compiled substantial bibliographic resources for the history of printing and books in Belgium, in particular the 7-volume Bibliographie gantoise and the 34-volume Bibliotheca Belgica, left uncompleted at his death and continued by Alphonse Roersch and Paul Bergmans. He donated his extensive personal collection of material printed in Ghent to the University Library, where it formed the basis of the "Gandavensia" collection.

He died in Ghent on 22 January 1913.

== Works ==
- Bibliographie gantoise (7 vols., Ghent, 1858–1869)
- Jaerboeken van het souvereine gilde der kolveniers, busschieters en kanonniers gezegd hoofdgilde van Sint Antone, te Gent, text edition (3 vols., Ghent, Maetschappy der Vlaemsche Bibliophilen, 1867)
- Marcus van Vaernewijck, Van die beroerlicke tijden in die Nederlanden en voornamelijk in Ghendt, text edition (5 vols., Ghent, Maetschappy der Vlaemsche Bibliophilen, 1872–1881)
- Bibliotheca Belgica: Bibliographie générale des Pays-Bas (34 vols., Ghent, 1880–1923).
