= Alfred Defuisseaux =

Belgian lawyer and politician (1843–1901)

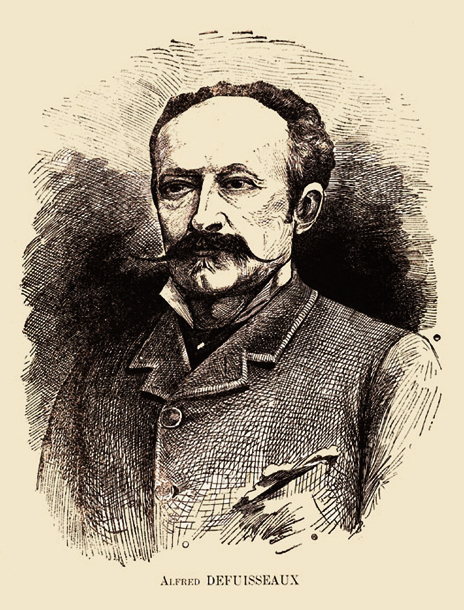

Personal details
- Born: Alfred Eloi Nicolas Defuisseaux; 9 December 1843 Mons, Hainaut Province, Belgium
- Died: 11 November 1901 (aged 57) Nimy, Mons, Hainaut Province, Belgium
- Party: Socialist Party
- Relations: Philippe Joseph Defuisseaux (grandfather); Nicolas Defuisseaux (father); Léon Defuisseaux (brother)
- Occupation: Lawyer; Politician

Alfred Defuisseaux (9 December 1843 – 11 November 1901) was a Belgian lawyer, writer, journalist, socialist, and politician.

== Biography ==
Alfred Eloi Nicolas Defuisseaux was born into a family of six in Mons, Hainaut Province, Belgium on 9 December 1843. His father was a Belgian lawyer and industrialist named Nicolas Defuisseaux. Alfred's grandfather, Philippe Joseph Defuisseaux, played a notable role in declaring the establishment of the French republic in the city of Mons in 1792.

Alfred Defuisseaux graduated as a Doctor of Law at the Free University of Brussels in 1868, registering as a lawyer at the Mons bar. His early legal practice centred on defending the working class through Workers' compensation cases, specifically representing coal miners who were victims of firedamp.

In 1870, Alfred helped the campaign of his older brother Léon, who was elected a Liberal Democratic Member of parliament. He also became an activist for universal suffrage.

Defuisseaux published A People's Catechism (French: Le catéchisme du peuple) in March 1886, which sold over 500,000 copies in working-class circles. This work aimed at educating the people against the ruling classes and the State before the eventual Belgian strike of 1886 occurred in the Province of Hainaut. His involvement led to his conviction by the Brabant Assizes, resulting in two six-month prison sentences. Fleeing to France before the verdict, he continued his political and journalistic efforts, and within five years, he was sentenced in absentia to 29 years in prison.

After being expelled from the Belgian Labour Party, Dufuisseaux formed the Republican Socialist Party which existed between 1887 and 1889 chiefly in Hainaut.

At the 1894 elections for the district of Mons, Defuisseaux represented Belgium's Socialist Party who backed him to win a seat in the Chamber of Representatives in the Belgian Parliament.

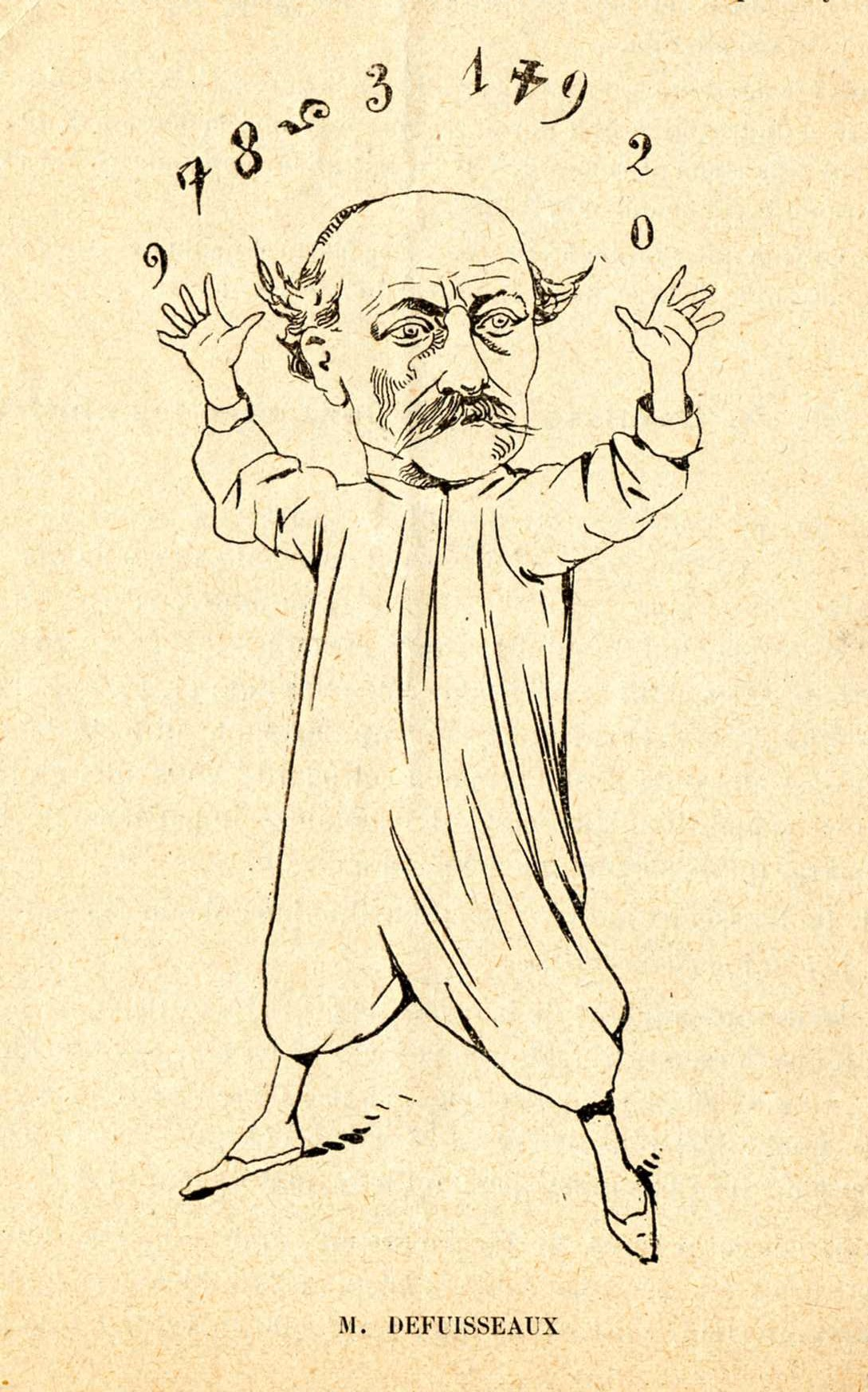
Alfred Defuisseaux juggling with figures from work accident statistics, in Pantalon's outfit. Illustration of a parliamentary debate. Caricature from Le Petit Belge. c. 1897.

As a member of the Commission of the XXI, formed on 13 February 1895, he took part in reviewing the draft law for the Congo's transfer to Belgium, alongside 14 Catholics, 4 socialists, and 3 liberals.

He was reelected as a socialist deputy in the Chamber of Representatives of Belgium for the district of Mons in 1898.

On 1 September 1900, he retired to Nimy in the city of Mons, Belgium.

== Death ==
Alfred Defuisseaux died on 11 November 1901 in Nimy, Mons, Hainaut Province, Belgium.

== Works ==
- A People's Catechism (French: Le catéchisme du peuple), 1886
- Moral Tales for the Use of the People (French: Contes moraux à l'usage du peuple), 1887
