= Republican Socialist Party =

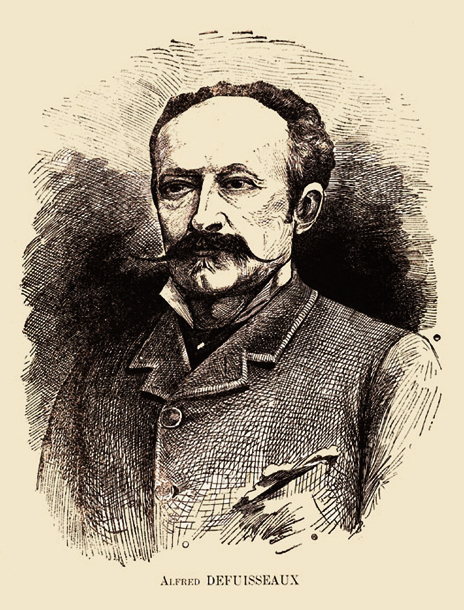
Portrait of Alfred Defuisseaux

The Republican Socialist Party (French: Parti socialiste républicain, or PSR) was a short-lived far-left political faction which split from the Belgian Labour Party (POB) and remained separate from 1887 and 1889. It maintained widespread popularity among miners and other industrial workers within Hainaut Province.

After being involved in the 1886 unrest, the lawyer Alfred Defuisseaux was expelled from the POB in February 1887. The split was based largely on Defuisseaux's endorsement of insurrectionary strikes as a political tool. He particularly endorsed the idea of a so-called "black strike" (grève noire), i.e., a complete general strike, to gain universal male suffrage. He was also inspired by Blanquism.

Defuisseaux founded the PSR in August 1887. Drawing on his popularity among socialist coal miners in the Borinage in particular, the new movement spread widely within Hainaut Province and severely weakened the POB in the region, especially around the Borinage and Charleroi. The PSR was also characterised by its Francophilia and Anti-German sentiment which also encouraged hostility towards the Flemish Movement. It published its own newspaper called La République Belge.

The year it was founded, the PSR led a wave of local strikes. In December 1888 several leading figures of the PSR were arrested, a blow that the party would not recuperate from. Through the legal proceedings that followed in 1889, information emerged that most of the PSR leadership were in fact agent provocateurs on the government's payroll. The influence of the party waned as a result of these revelations. The scandal became known as le Grand Complot (lit. 'the great plot'). The events of le Grand Complot were reenacted in a 1990 theatre play by the same name by Jean Louvet.

At the time of the centenary of the French Revolution of 1789, the PSR merged back into the POB. The PSR, albeit short-lived, represented the sole effort to build a structured republican political organization in Belgium.

== Bibliography ==
- Van Ginderachter, Maarten (2019). The everyday nationalism of workers: a social history of modern Belgium. Stanford: Stanford University Press. ISBN 978-1-5036-0969-3.
