= Jules Delecourt =

Belgian writer (1835-1906)

- Born: Jules Victor Delecourt; 9 October 1835; Mons, Kingdom of Belgium
- Died: 13 February 1906 (aged 70); Ixelles, Belgium
- Occupation: Writer
- Writing career
- Notable work: Essai d'un dictionnaire des ouvrages anonymes et pseudonymes publié en Belgique au 19e siècle et principalement depuis 1830

Jules Victor Delecourt was a Belgian writer and secretary of the Société des bibliophiles de Belgique.

== Biography ==
Jules Victor Delecourt was born in Mons, Kingdom of Belgium in 9 October 1835.

In 1863, he published a dictionary in Brussels titled Essai d'un dictionnaire des ouvrages anonymes et pseudonymes publié en Belgique au 19e siècle et principalement depuis 1830, covering anonymous books and pseudonyms from 19th-century Belgium, primarily since 1830.

He published Bibliographie de l'histoire du Hainaut, a historical account of Hainaut, in 1864.

In 1866, he served as the secretary of the Society of Bibliophiles of Belgium (French: Société des bibliophiles de Belgique) in Mons. That year, the first issue of Le Bibliophile Belge, the society's journal, included his discoveries about the historical materials of Patrice Beaucourt de Noortvelde.

== Death ==
Jules Victor Delecourt died in Ixelles, Belgium on 13 February 1906.

== Family ==
His wife was Marie Elise Joachime Victoire Hubertine Sophie Chalon, and they had a son, Victor Charles Renier Jules Delecourt.

== Works ==
- Compendium of ordinances of the Austrian Netherlands (French: Recueil des ordonnances des Pays-Bas autrichiens), 1860
- Essay on a dictionary of anonymous & pseudonymous works published in Belgium in the 19th century and mainly since 1830 (French: Essai d'un dictionnaire des ouvrages anonymes et pseudonymes publié en Belgique au 19e siècle et principalement depuis), 1863
- Bibliography of the History of Hainaut (French: Bibliographie de l'histoire du Hainaut), 1864
- Eccentric Belgian Authors: Guillaume Gensse (French: Auteurs belges excentriques: Guillaume Gensse), 1867
- Customs of the Country and County of Hainaut (French: Coutumes Du Pays Et Comté de Hainaut), 1871
