= Society of Sciences, Arts and Letters of Hainaut =

Learned society for Belgian intellectuals

- Formation: 14 March 1833
- Founded at: Mons, Hainaut, Belgium
- Headquarters: Mons, Hainaut
- Region served: Belgium
- Official language: French
- Main organ: Mémoires et publications de la Société des sciences, des arts et des lettres du Hainaut

The Society of Sciences, Arts and Letters of Hainaut (French: Société des sciences, des arts et des lettres du Hainaut) was a learned society for Belgian intellectuals in the 1830s. It was established to advance intellectual pursuits within the province of Hainaut.

== History ==
The Society of Sciences, Arts and Letters of Hainaut was founded on 14 March 1833 in Mons, Hainaut Province in Belgium.

In the early 1840s, the society's leadership included Nicolas Defuisseaux as president, Camille Wins and Camille Joseph Castiaux as vice presidents, Adolphe Mathieu as General Secretary, and Augustin Lacroix as Librarian and Archivist. On April 17, 1843, the society's tenth anniversary was celebrated with a public session that attracted members, foreign scholars, and a large, select audience.

== Publication ==
In 1840, the first volume of the society's journal Mémoires et publications de la Société des sciences, des arts et des lettres du Hainaut was released. By 1842–1843, it was published in Mons by Belgian printer Emmanuel Hoyois.

In 1877, the publication of the society was featured in the library of the Academy of Natural Sciences of Philadelphia. In 1878, the Library of the Wisconsin Academy of Sciences, Arts, And Letters held the memoirs published throughout the 1870s.

As early as January 1878, the society was a Foreign Correspondent of the Smithsonian Institution in Washington D.C.
