= Belgian strike of 1886 =

General strike in Belgium

Social revolt of 1886
- Révolte sociale de 1886; Part of Belgium in the long nineteenth century
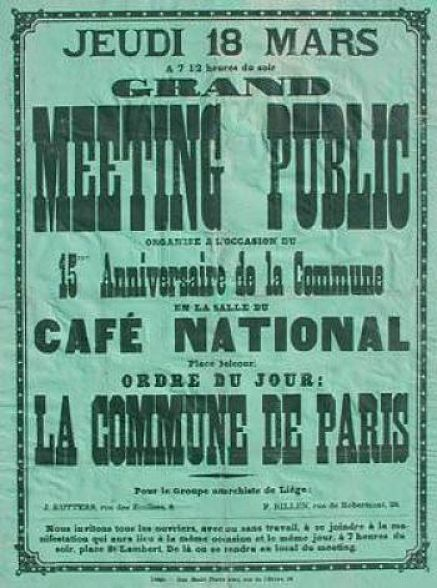
- A poster publicising a meeting to mark the Paris Commune in Liège
- Date: 18-29 March 1886
- Location: Sillon industriel
- Caused by: Economic depression
- Methods: Demonstrations, strikes, direct action

Parties
Workers; Anarchists	Belgian government Gendarmerie; Belgian Army; Garde Civique; Sûreté Publique

Lead figures
August Wagener; Alfred Defuisseaux	Leopold II

The Belgian strikes of 1886, occasionally known as the social revolt of 1886 (French: Révolte sociale de 1886), was a violent period of industrial strikes and riots in Belgium from 18 to 29 March 1886 and an important moment in Belgium's 19th-century history. The strike and labour revolt was provoked by social inequalities in Belgian society and has been compared to the peasant jacqueries of the Middle Ages.

== Strike ==
The strike of 1886 originated as a small gathering organised by anarchists in Liège to commemorate the 15th anniversary of the establishment of the Paris Commune on 18 March. The call met with unexpected support, partly as a result of the ongoing economic downturn and harsh winter. Between 800 and 900 workers, many from the city's metal works, attended the initial demonstration led by August Wagener. Rather than abating, the strike soon spread across Belgium's industrial regions to the Province of Hainaut. In Hainaut, it was notably led by the radical socialist Alfred Defuisseaux.

The 1886 strike became famous for its violence. A glass factory that had been known for automating its production was destroyed by rioters. The Belgian Army was deployed to the region and two "classes" of reservists were called up. Several dozen people were killed in confrontations with the Army, Garde Civique and Gendarmerie. Ten workers were killed in a single incident in Roux, near Charleroi, on 29 March. The 1886 revolt has been described by modern historians as "the biggest and most violent strike wave ever to sweep across industrial Wallonia".

Although the strike failed to achieve any tangible objectives, it is considered by historians to be the first time the Belgian working class achieved significant concessions from the national government. A parliamentary Labour Commission (Enquête du Travail) was created which led to the first labour legislation in Belgian history. Two leaders of the glassmakers union, blamed for the damage, were defended in court by the future Walloon socialist politician Jules Destrée. They were found guilty but granted an amnesty in 1888.

Politically, the strikes led to the emergence of a parliamentary socialist party which aimed to redirect workers' demands away from violence and towards the cause of electoral reform. This led to a decisive break between socialists and the Liberal Party. Defuisseaux was expelled from the Belgian Workers' Party and established his own radical socialist party, the Parti Socialiste Républicaine. He also published a hugely successful pamphlet entitled Le catéchisme du peuple (The People's Catechism). The 1886 strikes led to the rapid expansion of the trade unions across Belgium. The Liberals also splintered politically, leading to the creation of a separate, new and more radical party, the Parti Progressiste under Paul Janson, which would remain separate until 1900. For the governing centre-right Catholic Party of Auguste Beernaert, the strikes led to a change of ideology towards social Catholicism. It was followed by further strikes in 1887, 1890 and 1891, as well as a general strike in 1893.

In the aftermath of the strike, 27 supposed leaders (including Defuisseaux) were tried before the court of assizes in Mons in May 1889. Highly publicized, the trial collapsed when it emerged that the Sûreté Publique had infiltrated the radical group, acting as agents provocateurs.

== Depictions of the revolt ==
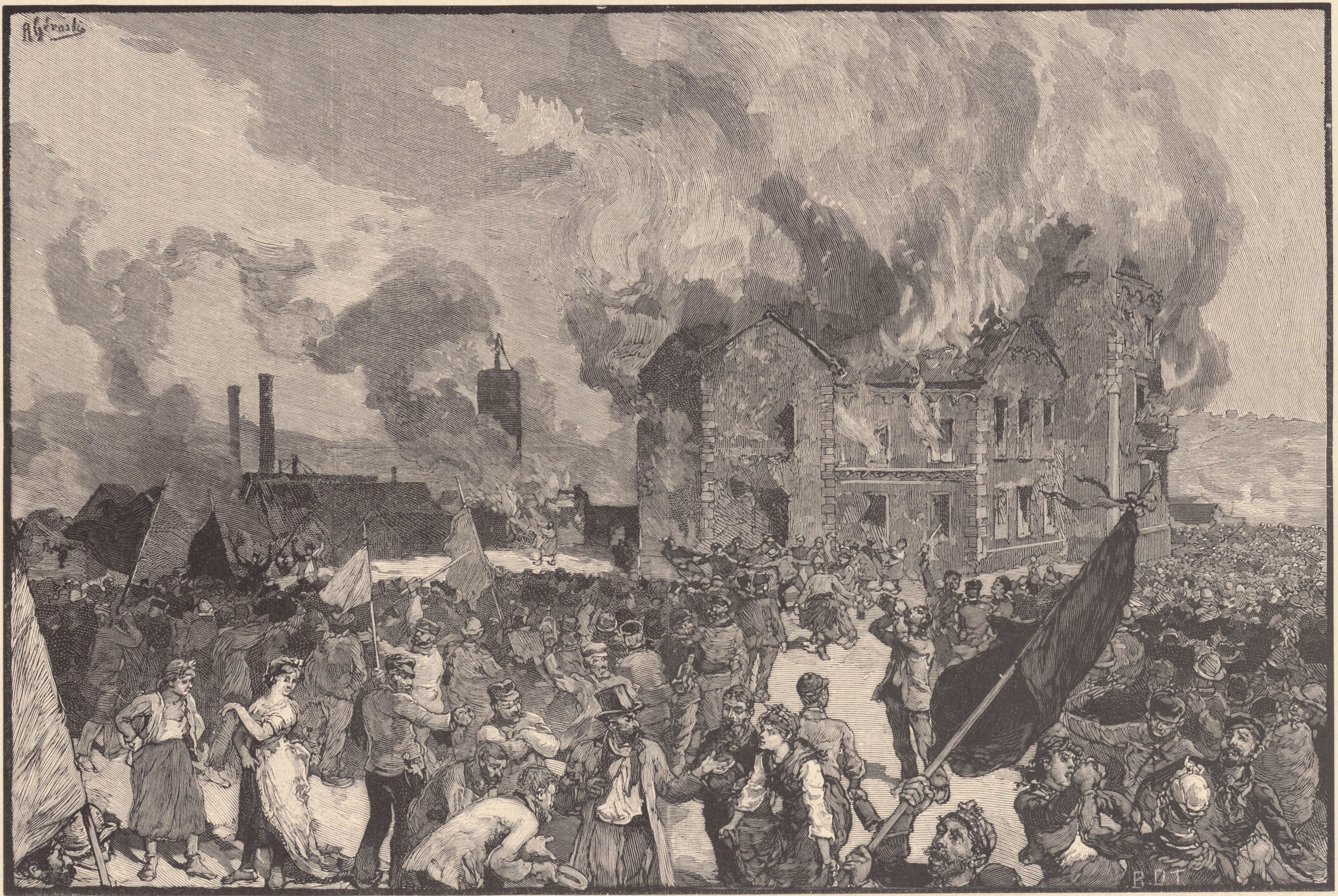
An illustration depicting strikers burning the glass factory and château of M. Baudoux at Jumet during the strike, as depicted in Le Monde Illustré

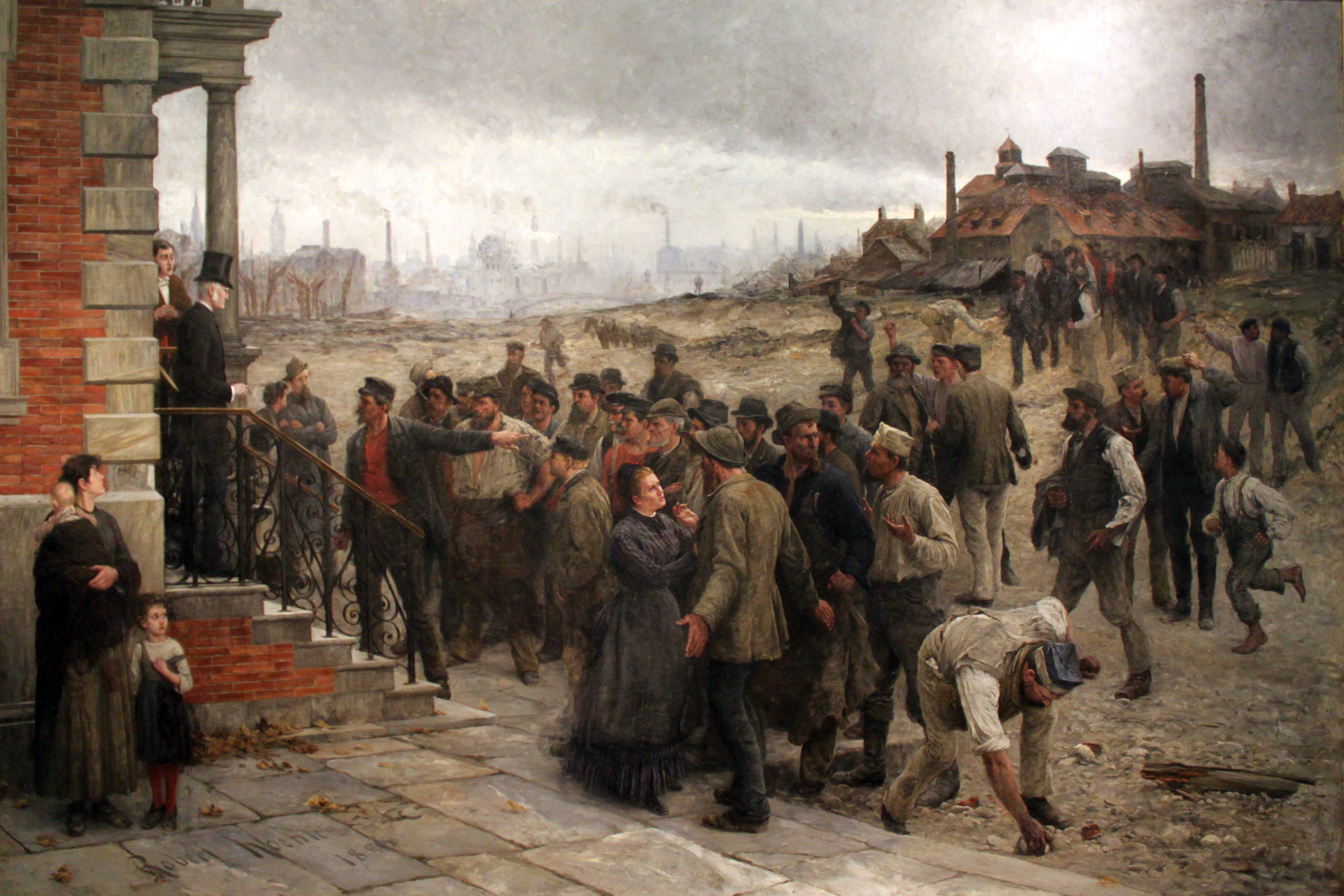
The Strike (1886) by Robert Koehler, often assumed to depict the 1886 strikes in Belgium

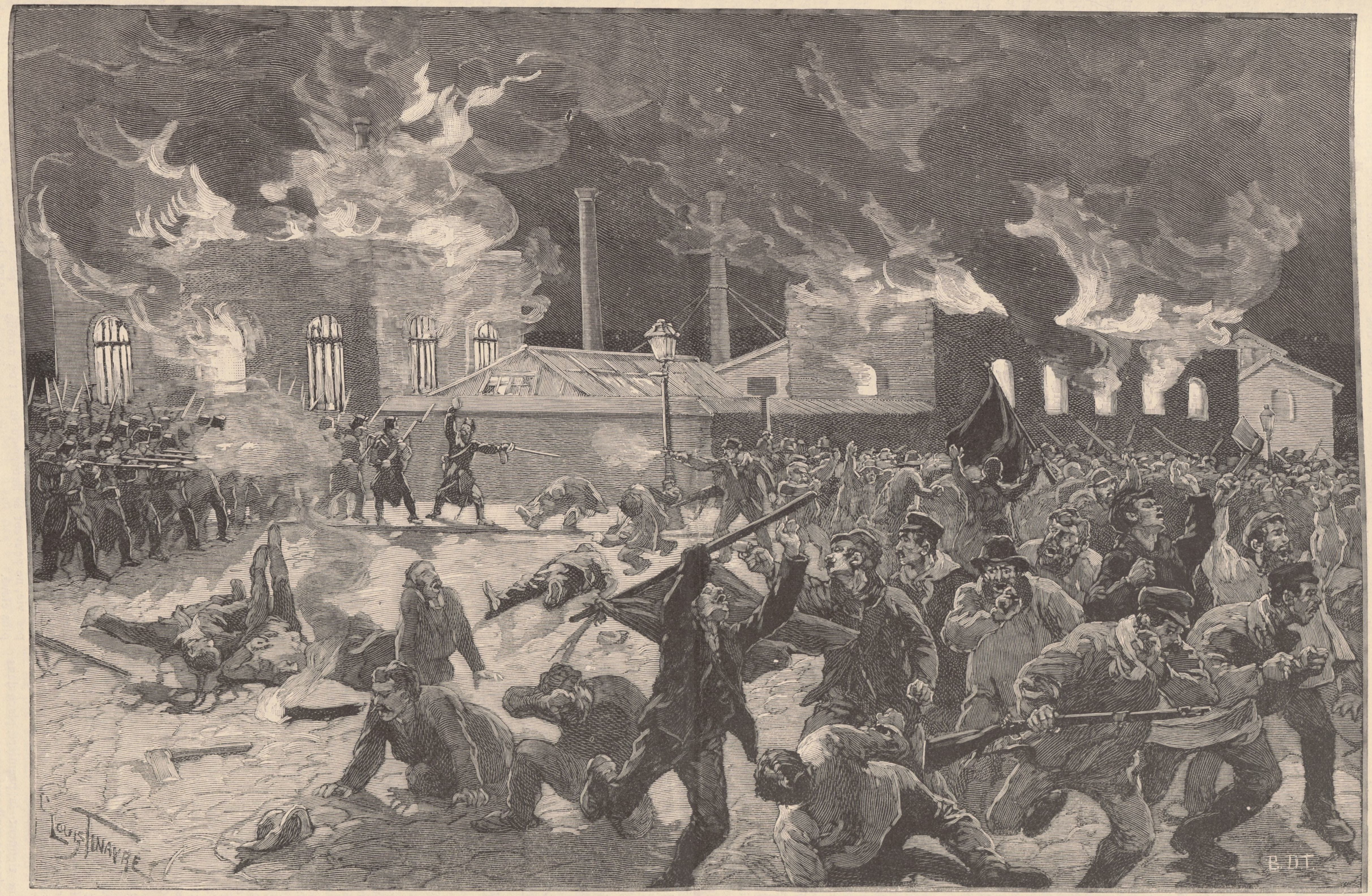
Soldiers open fire on rioters in Roux after the burning of a factory. An engraving by Louis Tinayre from Le Monde Illustré based on sketches by their correspondent

== See also ==
- General strikes in Belgium
- Bloody Sunday (1887) in the United Kingdom
