= Constant-Philippe Serrure =

Belgian historian and collector

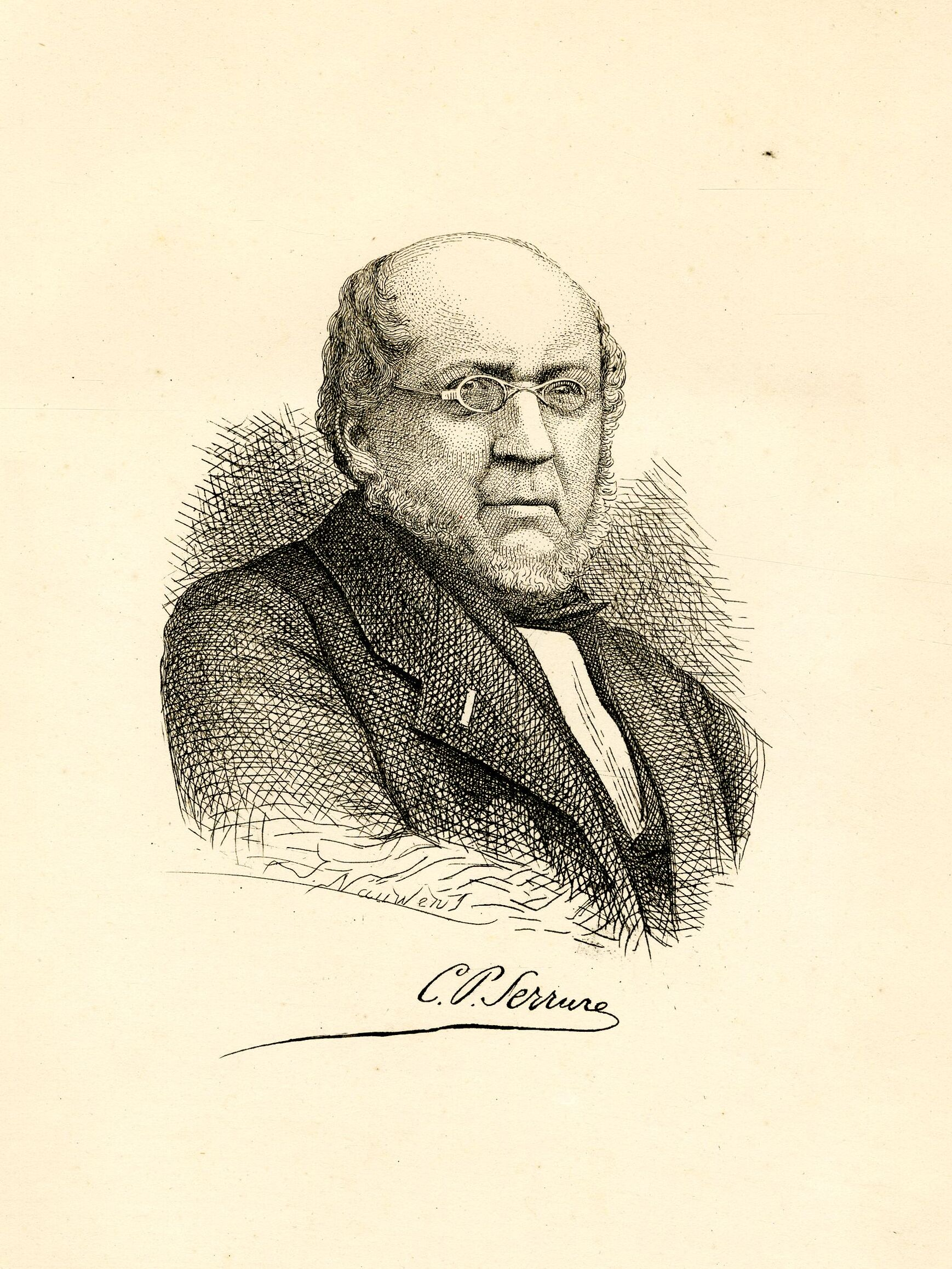

Constant-Philippe Serrure (1805–1872) was a prolific Belgian historian and collector who taught at Ghent University. He was a founding member and active contributor of the Maetschappy der Vlaemsche Bibliophilen, which published editions of medieval Flemish texts.

== Life ==
Serrure was born in Antwerp on 22 September 1805, the son of the diamond merchant Pierre-François Serrure and Jeanne-Pétronille van der Schrieck (1774–1855). After his secondary education he briefly worked as a clerk in the tax administration and then enrolled to study law at the State University of Leuven. He graduated in 1832, after delays caused in part by the Belgian Revolution of 1830 and in part by his own dedication to historical research rather than legal studies. He worked as a lawyer in Antwerp for a few months before being appointed conservator of the State Archives in Ghent in 1833. During his first years there he prepared an edition of the cartulary of Saint Bavo's Abbey. He was involved in reviving the Messager des sciences historiques, publication of which had been suspended since 1830, and was on the city of Ghent's street-naming committee.

On 30 July 1834, he married Mathilde van Damme, daughter of Antoine van Damme and Régine Hautshont. From 1835, he taught courses on Belgian history and medieval history at Ghent University, the former until 1868 and the latter until 1871. He served as dean of the Faculty of Philosophy and Letters from 1850 to 1854 and was made a knight in the Order of Leopold on 24 September 1855. He went on to serve as rector of the university from 1855 to 1857, when he was removed from office by the government due to political frictions.

From 1855 to 1863 he edited five volumes of a literary and historical miscellany under the title Vaderlandsch museum voor Nederduitsche letterkunde, oudheid en geschiedenis.

He became emeritus on 19 August 1871, thereafter living in retirement in Moortsele, where he died on 6 April 1872. When his collections of books, medals, coins, artworks and antiques were auctioned off after his death, the catalogue was printed in 14 volumes.

== Publications ==
Apart from compiling many auction catalogues, and contributing to several journals and periodicals, Serrure published:

- Le livre de Baudoyn, conte de Flandre, suivi de fragments du roman de Trasignyes, edited by Serrure and Voisin (Brussels, 1836)
- Sur la naissance de Marguerite de Parme, gouvernante des Pays-Bas (Ghent, 1836).
- Cartulaire de St-Bavon à Gand (Ghent, 1836-1838)
- Voyages et ambassades de messire Guillebert de Lannoy (Mons, 1840)
- Le cabinet monétaire de Son Altesse le Prince de Ligne (Ghent, 1847)
- Jan van Havre, Arx Virtutis sive de vera animi tranquilitate satyrae tres, edited by Serrure (Ghent, 1857)
- Jan van Havre, heer van Walle, beschouwd als latijnsch dichter, als ambtenaer en als voornaem weldoener en begiftiger van de arme scholen der Stad Gent (Ghent, 1861)
- Notice sur un tableau du XVe siècle, provenant de l'église de St-Bavon, à Gand (Ghent, 1862)
- Engelbert II, comte de Nassau, lieutenant général de Maximilien et de Philippe le Beau aux Pays-Bas (Ghent, 1862).

Editions for the Maetschappy der Vlaemsche Bibliophilen

- 1839: Kronyk van Vlaenderen van 580 tot 1467, with Philip Blommaert, 2 volumes. Both volumes in one on Google Books.
- 1839: Dagverhael van den oproer te Antwerpen in 1659. On Google Books
- 1848: Dystorie van Saladine. On Google Books
- 1852: Dit syn de coren van de stad Antwerpen On Google Books
- 1852-54: De Grimbergsche Oorlog, ridderdicht uit de XIVe eeuw, with Philip Blommaert (2 volumes). Vol. 1 and vol. 2 on Google Books.
- 1857: Van Homulus, een schoene comedie, daer in begrepen wordt hoe in de tyt des doots der mensche alle geschapen dinghen verlaten dan alleene die duecht, die blyft by hem, vermeerdert ende ghebetert ende is zeer schoon ende genuechlijk om lesen. On Google Books
- 1860: Baghynken van Parys, oock is hier by ghedaen die wyse leeringe die Catho zynen sone leerde. On Google Books
- 1860: Lambertus Goetman, De Spiegel der Jongers. On Google Books
- 1861: Dat dyalogus of twistsprake tusschen den wisen coninck Salomon ende Marcophus.
- 1861: De Weerbare mannen van het land van Waes in 1480, 1552 en 1558. On Google Books
- 1863: Tafereelen uit het leven van Jesus: Een handschrift van de XVe eeuw. On Google Books
- 1869: Gedichten van Claude De Clerck (1618-1640). On Google Books
- 1871: Het leven van Pater Petrus-Thomas van Hamme, missionaris in Mexico en China (1651-1727). On Google Books
- 1872: Keuken-boek, uitgegeven naar een handschrift der XVe eeuw. On Google Books
