= Camille Wins =

Belgian lawyer (1803-1856)

- Born: Camille Bernard Joseph Wins; 7 November 1803; Mons, Hainaut Province, Department of Jemmapes, French Republic
- Died: 4 October 1856 (aged 52); Mons, Hainaut Province, Belgium
- Occupation: Lawyer
- Relatives: Paul Antoine Herman Wins (uncle)

Camille Wins (7 November 1803 — 4 October 1856) was a Belgian lawyer and writer.

== Biography ==
=== Early life and education ===
Camille Bernard Joseph Wins was born in Mons, Hainaut Province, Department of Jemmapes, French Republic (now Belgium) on 7 November 1803.

Wins studied humanities at the College of Mons. In 1821, he enrolled at the State University of Leuven and received his Doctor of Law degree in December 1825.

=== Career ===
Upon returning to Mons to practice law, he interned with the late Jean-François-Joseph Dolez and quickly built a large clientele. In October 1830, he became a deputy judge at the Mons court.

He joined the Society of Sciences, Arts and Letters of Hainaut shortly after its founding in 1833, offering his diverse studies and collaboration, leading to his appointment as vice president in the 1840s and eventually president.

Honorary canon Paul Antoine Herman Wins, his uncle and the late dean of the Mons Church of Sainte Elisabeth, left the bulk of his extensive library to his nephew in 1834, recognizing his bibliophilic expertise. In 1835, Camille Wins was a founding member of the Société des bibliophiles de Belgique in Mons and was appointed secretary in 1839 to replace the late Charles Delecourt, playing an active role until 1856. He later became the president of the Society of Bibliophiles of Belgium. He also served on the steering committee of the Mons Public Library, where he held the position of secretary.

In the early months of 1839, he was a witness at the proceedings of the formation of the public limited company of the Marais Glassworks owned by Prosper Wins. In May 1839, the lawyer residing in Mons was a witness before the notary André Baudelet of Mons for the establishment of the Limited company of the machine and mechanical construction workshops of Boussu (French: Société anonyme des ateliers de construction de machines et mécaniques de Boussu). He acted as one of the company's commissioners, with headquarters in Boussu, a district of Mons.

In 1845, as vice president of the Society of Sciences and Letters of Hainaut and Belgian Bibliophiles' secretary, Wins published Phrenological Discourse on Napoleon about Napoleon I. He also paid homage to the Prince President of the French Republic Napoleon III. Charles-François de Ladoucette, a member of French Senate, had the honour of presenting a copy of the Memoirs and Publications of the Society of Sciences, Arts and Letters of Hainaut to the prince.

The Society of Arts and Letters of Hainaut formed a commission in 1840, including Camille Wins, A. Lacroix, and Adolphe Mahieu, to coordinate with Mons' administration for a Roland de Lassus statue. By 1850, Wins was appointed by the State to an 8-member commission to submit preliminary measures. The first stone was laid on 8 September 1851 in the presence of Leopold II.

On 28 September 1856, during public celebrations of the 26th anniversary of Belgian independence at the Grand-Place de Mons, Wins fell from the top of a balcony onto flagstones below, suffering internal injuries.

== Death ==
Camille Wins died in Mons, Belgium on 4 October 1856. His funeral took place on 6 October 1856.

== Works ==
- Phrenological discourse on Napoleon (French: Discours phrénologique sur Napoléon), 1845
- On the part that the Hainaut science society took in the erection of the statue of Orlande de Lassus, famous composer from Mons (French: De la part que la société des sciences du Hainaut a prise à l érection de la statue d Orlande de Lassus célèbre compositeur montois), 1854
