= Société des bibliophiles belges =

Belgian learned society for bibliophilists

Société des bibliophiles de Belgique
- Formation: 4 April 1835
- Founded at: Mons, Hainaut, Belgium
- Headquarters: Hainaut
- Region served: Belgium
- Official language: French

The Société des bibliophiles belges séant à Mons (English: Society of Belgian Bibliophiles sitting at Mons) was a learned society for Belgian bibliophiles formed in the mid-1830s. It was established in the province of Hainaut to publish unedited literary and historical documents.

== History ==
The Society of Belgian Bibliophiles was founded on 4 April 1835 in Mons, Hainaut Province, Belgium. The number of members was limited to 25 people. One of the founders was Camille Wins, who assumed the role of secretary from 1839 until 1856.

In 1836, the Belgian Bibliophiles Society's first publication was released. By the 1840s, the Belgian printer Emmanuel Hoyois was publishing it in Mons.

In 1844–1845, a new bulletin, The Belgian Bibliophile (French: Le bibliophile belge), was created, with the first volume published in Brussels.

By 1845, the society had expanded to 40 effective members and 6 honorary members. Up until then, only three works had been published and distributed: Secret Correspondence of Margaret of Parma with Philip II; Letters on the Life Interior of Charles V; and The Memoirs of Charles III de Croÿ, fourth Duke of Arschot.

In 1866, the board of the society consisted of Xavier de Theux of Brussels as president, Ferdinand van der Haeghen of Ghent as vice president, Gustave Hagemans of Brussels as treasurer, and Jules Delecourt of Brussels as secretary.

As early as January 1878, the society was reported as a foreign correspondent of the Smithsonian Institution in Washington D.C.
