= Paul Bergmans =

Belgian librarian and musical historian

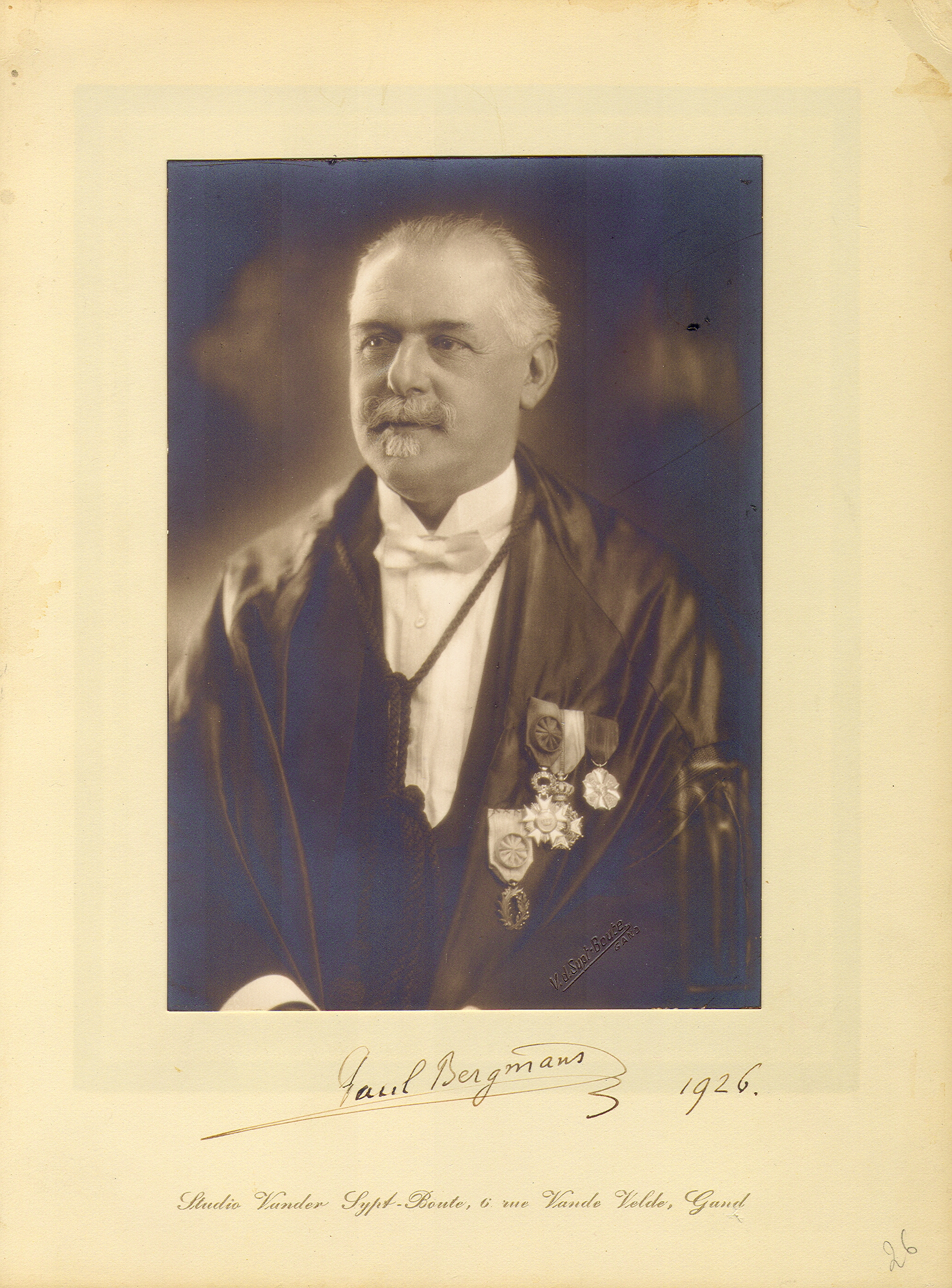
Paul Bergmans (1926)

Paul Jean Etienne Charles Marie Bergmans (1868–1935) was a librarian in chief of the University of Ghent, and musical historian.

== Life ==
Bergmans was born in Ghent on 23 February 1868. He began work at Ghent University Library on a voluntary basis, aged thirteen, while studying at Ghent's athenaeum. His first publication, in the Messager des sciences historiques (1884), came out when he was sixteen. In 1887, he graduated Doctor of Philosophy and Candidate of Law. In 1892, he was appointed assistant librarian to Ghent university library. By 1912, he had been promoted to first under-librarian, and in that year he became a corresponding member of the Académie Royale de Belgique. After the end of the First World War, he became the university's head librarian and a full member of the royal academy. In the meantime, he had become the first person to hold a chair in Music History at a Belgian university.

When Ghent University became a Dutch-language institution in 1929, Bergmans was no longer able to lecture. He began teaching history and heraldry at the Ecole des Hautes Études de Gand. In 1933, he retired from the library and was awarded the status of professor emeritus by the university.

He was a contributor to the Biographie Nationale de Belgique, serving as secretary to the Commission for National Biography from 1915 to 1935. In 1913, together with Alphonse Roersch, he took up the editorship of the Bibliotheca belgica after Ferdinand van der Haeghen's death. He was also a member of the Royal Academy of Archaeology of Belgium.

He died in Ghent on 14 November 1935.

== Works ==
- Analectes belgiques (1896)
- Les imprimeurs belges à l'étranger (1896 and 1922)
- with Joseph Casier, L'art ancien dans les Flandres (3 vols., 1914, 1921 and 1922)
- Variétés musicologiques (3 vols., 1891, 1901 and 1919)
- La typographie musicale en Belgique au XVIe siècle (1929)
- Armorial de Flandre au XVIe siècle (1919).

== Honours ==
- Member of the Royal Academy of Science, Letters and Fine Arts of Belgium.
- 1929: Officer in the Order of Leopold.
- 1933: Commander in the Order of the Crown.
- 1929: Knight of the Legion of Honour.
