= Philip Blommaert =

Belgian writer

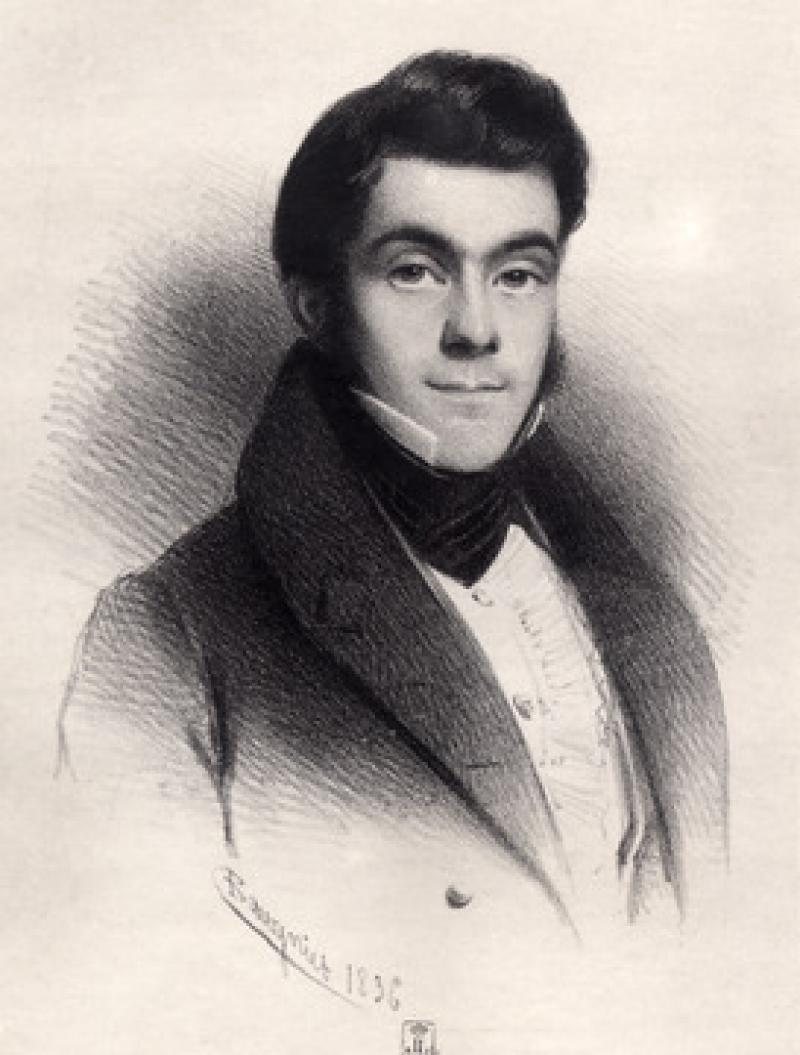
- Drawing of Philip Blommaert by Charles Baugniet (1836)
- Born: 24 August 1809
- Died: 14 August 1871 (aged 61)

Philip, Esquire Blommaert (Ghent, 24 August 1809 – 14 August 1871) was a Belgian writer.

He earned his living as a private scholar and was a friend and comrade of Hendrik Conscience with whom he promoted the use of Dutch in Belgium.

In 1834 he wrote poems for the Flemish magazine Vaderlandsche Letteroefeningen in Dutch, but with little success because of their rough language. Together with Jan Frans Willems he worked for several Belgian magazines against the influence of the French language in Flanders, and in 1840 was one of the co-authors of the Vlaams petitionnement (E: Flemish petition) to support the Flemish cause in Belgium.

Of more importance was the publication of Dutch poems from the 12th to 14th centuries, such as Theophilus (Ghent 1836, 2nd edition 1858), and Oudvlaemsche gedichten (1838–1851, 3 Volumes), as well as a Dutch translation of the Nibelungenlied in iambic verse. Together with C.P. Serrure he founded the Maetschappy der Vlaemsche Bibliophilen, a text publication society to produce editions of medieval Flemish literature. Together with Serrure he edited the Kronyk van Vlaenderen van 580 tot 1467 for publication in 1839.

His most famous work was the Aloude geschiedenis der Belgen of Nederduitschers (Ghent 1849), where he gave his opinion that the Low German areas are destined, despite their political divisions, to the fulfillment of a high cultural-historical idea.

== Later years ==
In 1860 he became a member of the Royal Belgian Academy, where he took part in the work of the commission for the publication of a Flemish cultural monument. He had started working on the publication Jacob van Maerlant's just-discovered poem Istory van Troyen. when he died.

== See also ==
- Flemish literature
