= Maetschappy der Vlaemsche Bibliophilen =

The Maetschappy der Vlaemsche Bibliophilen, in its later years Maatschappij der Vlaamsche Bibliophilen ("Society of Flemish Bibliophiles") was a text publication society based in Ghent, Belgium. The society was founded by Philip Blommaert and Constant-Philippe Serrure in 1839 to produce editions of medieval Flemish literature. It was active until 1909. By current scholarly standards, the quality of the editions shows little palaeographical and codicological expertise.

Membership was initially limited to 28, but was later expanded to 40. Membership initially cost a down payment of 20 Belgian francs followed by an ongoing subscription of 10 francs every six months. A restricted number of copies were printed on fine paper for members, and for deposit with Ghent University library, and the Royal Library of Belgium, but the society also produced longer runs on cheaper paper in order to encourage a wider knowledge and love of Flemish literary classics of the past. A small number of their publications were available only to members in luxury editions.

== Publications ==
First series

- 1. Het Beclach van Jhr. Jan Van Hembyze
- 2. Dagverhael van den oproer te Antwerpen in 1659 (1839). On Google Books
- 3. Kronyk van Vlaenderen van 580 tot 1467, 2 volumes (1839). Both volumes in one on Google Books.
- 4. Leven van Sinte Amand, patroon der Nederlanden, dichtwerk der XIVe eeuw, in 2 volumes. Vol. 2 on Google Books

Second series

- 1. Het Beleg van Gent ten jare 985, naer een Hs. van Gilles De Voocht (XVIe eeuw)
- 2. Dit syn de coren van de stad Antwerpen (1852). On Google Books
- 3. Der Vrouwen Heimelykheid, dichtwerk der XIVe eeuw
- 4. Verhael der Reformatie van de Abdy van Maegdendale, voorheen een vrouwenklooster binnen de stad Audenaerde. 1468
- 5. Gewoonten, vryheden en privilegien der stad Sint-Truyen (XIVe eeuw). On Google Books
- 6. Het spel van de V vroede ende van de V dwaeze maegden. Naer een Handschrift van het begin der XVIe eeuw. On Google Books
- 7. Politieke Balladen, Refereinen, Liederen en Spotgedichten der XVIe eeuw
- 8. De Boec van Catone, een dietsch leerdicht, uit het latyn. Naer een handschrift van het einde der XIIIe eeuw
- 9. Oudvlaemsche Liederen en andere Gedichten der XIVe en XVe eeuwen
- 10. Journal ofte dagregister van onze reyze naer de keyzerlyke stadt van Weenen, ten jare 1716. On Google Books
- 11. Verslag van 't Magistraet van Gent, nopens de godsdienstige beroerten aldaer, loopende van den 30 Juny 1566 tot den 30 April 1567; gevolgd door talryke bewysstukken
- 12. Het Leven van Philippus den Stauten, hertoch van Borgonien, ende van Margarita Van Male, gravinne van Vlaenderen
- 13. Het Leven van Joannes den Onbevreesden, hertoch van Borgonien graef van Vlaenderen
- 14. De Grimbergsche Oorlog, ridderdicht uit de XIVe eeuw, 2 volumes. Vol. 1 and vol. 2 on Google Books.
- 15. Memorieboek der Stad Ghent van't j. 1301 tot 1793, 3 volumes. Vol. 1, vol. 2, vol. 3 on Google Books

Third series

- 1. Jan van Ruusbroec, Dat Boec van den gheesteleken Tabernacule, 2 volumes (1858). Both volumes on Google Books
- 2. Het Boec van al't gene datter geschiedt is binnen Brugghe sichtent jaer 1477, 14 Februarii tot 1491
- 3. Lamentatie van Zegher Van Male, behelsende wat datter aenmerckensweerdig geschiet is ten tyde van de Geuserie ende de Beeltstormerie binnen ende omtrent de stadt van Brugghe. On Google Books
- 4. Jan van Ruusbroec, Dat boec van den Twaelf Dogheden. Die Spieghel der Exigher Salicheit. Van den Kerstenen Ghelove (1860). On Google Books
- 5. Dagboek van Jan De Pottre, 1549–1602. Naer het oorspronkelijk handschrift in de koninklyke bibliotheek te Brussel berustende
- 6. De Weerbare mannen van het land van Waes in 1480, 1552 en 1558 (1861). On Google Books
- 7. Jan van Ruusbroec, Dat boec van .vii. trappen inden graet der Gheesterliker minnen. Dat boec van seven sloten. Dat boec vanden rike der ghelieven. Dat boec vanden vier becoringhen (1861). On Google Books
- 8. Tafereelen uit het leven van Jesus: Een handschrift van de XVe eeuw (1863). On Google Books
- 9. Jan van Ruusbroec, Dat boec vanden twaelf beghinen (1863). On Google Books
- 10. Augustijn van Hermelghem, Nederlandsche Historie, 2 volumes (1864–1867). Both volumes in one on Google Books.
- 11. Jaerboeken van het souvereine gilde der kolveniers, busschieters en kanonniers gezegd hoofdgilde van Sint Antone, te Gent, vol. 1 (1867). On Google Books
- 12. Jan van Ruusbroec, Die chierheit der gheesteleker brulocht. Dat hantvingherlijn oft vanden blickenden steene. Dat boec der hoechster waerheit
- 13. Claudius de Clerck, Gedichten van Claude De Clerck (1618-1640) (1869). On Google Books
- 14. Het leven van Pater Petrus-Thomas van Hamme, missionaris in Mexico en China, 1651-1727 (1871). On Google Books
- 15. Filips Wielant, Practijcke criminele van Philips Wielant, naar het eenig bekende handschrift

Fourth series

- 1. Marcus van Vaernewijck, Van die beroerlicke tijden in die Nederlanden en voornamelijk in Ghendt, 1566-1568. Vol. 1 (1873), vol. 2 (1873),vol. 3 (1874), vol. 4 (1876), vol. 5 (1881)
- 2. Hadewijch, Werken van Zuster Hadewijch. I. Gedichten (1875)
- 3. Joos Lambrecht, Néderlandsche spellijnghe: uutghesteld by vrághe ende andwoorde (1882)
- 4. Anna Bijns, Nieuwe refereinen (1886)
- 5. De voorgeboden der stad Gent in de XIVe eeuw, 1337–1382 (1885)
- 7. Het Klooster ten Walle en de abdij van den Groenen Briel: stukken en oorkonden (1888)
- 8. Oude Nederlandsche liederen : melodieën uit de Souterliedekens (1889)
- 9. Dit es tbesouch van dien dat Pieter Boe ende Leuz sijn broeder ontcracht waren den here vor Sinte Verrilden Kerke te Ghent (1890)
- 10. Hier beghinnen de Sermonen oft wtlegghingen op alle de Euangelien vander Vasten, metter Passien, alsomen die inder kercken houdt zeer costelijck wtgheleyt (1893)
- 11. Werken van Zuster Hadewijch. II. Proza (1895)
- 12. Dagboek van Gent van 1447 tot 1470 met een vervolg van 1477 tot 1515, 2 volumes (1901–1904)
- 13. Het godshuis van Sint-Jan en Sint-Pauwel te Gent, bijgenaamd de Leugemeete: Oorkonden (1902)
- 14. Werken van Zuster Hadewijch. III. (1905)
- 15. Het godshuis van Sint Jan en Sint Pauwel te Gent, bijgenaamd de Leugemeete: de kapel en haar muurschilderingen van +/- 1346 (1909)

Bibliophile editions published for members only

- Dystorie van Saladine (1848). On Google Books
- Die Historie vander goeder vrouwen Griseldis, die een spieghel is gheweest van patienten
- Declaratie van der Triumphe bewezen den hooghe gheboren prince van Spaengien, Philips, des keizers Chaerles van Oostenrijc zone, binnen der stad van Ghend, in Vlaender, den xiij Julii, anno M.D.xlix.
- Beschryvinghe van het ghene dat vertoocht wierdt ter incomste van d'excellentie des princen van Praegien binnen der stede van Ghendt, den XXIX Decembris 1577
- Eene schoone historie van Mariken van Nimweghen, een seer wonderlijcke ende waerachtige geschiedenisse, hoe sy meer dan seven jaren met den duyvel woonde ende verkeerde
- Van Homulus, een schoene comedie, daer in begrepen wordt hoe in de tyt des doots der mensche alle geschapen dinghen verlaten dan alleene die duecht, die blyft by hem, vermeerdert ende ghebetert ende is zeer schoon ende genuechlijk om lesen. On Google Books
- Baghynken van Parys, oock is hier by ghedaen die wyse leeringe die Catho zynen sone leerde. On Google Books
- Lambertus Goetman, De Spiegel der Jongers (1860). On Google Books
- Dat dyalogus of twistsprake tusschen den wisen coninck Salomon ende Marcophus (1861).
- Keuken-boek, uitgegeven naar een handschrift der XVe eeuw (1872). On Google Books
- Refereynen ... Vertooght binnen Ghendt by de xix. cameren van Rhetorijcken aldaer comparerende den xx. in April M.D. neghen ende dertigh (1877). On Google Books
