= Patrice Beaucourt de Noortvelde =

Belgian historian and poet (1720-1796)

Patrice Beaucourt of Noortvelde
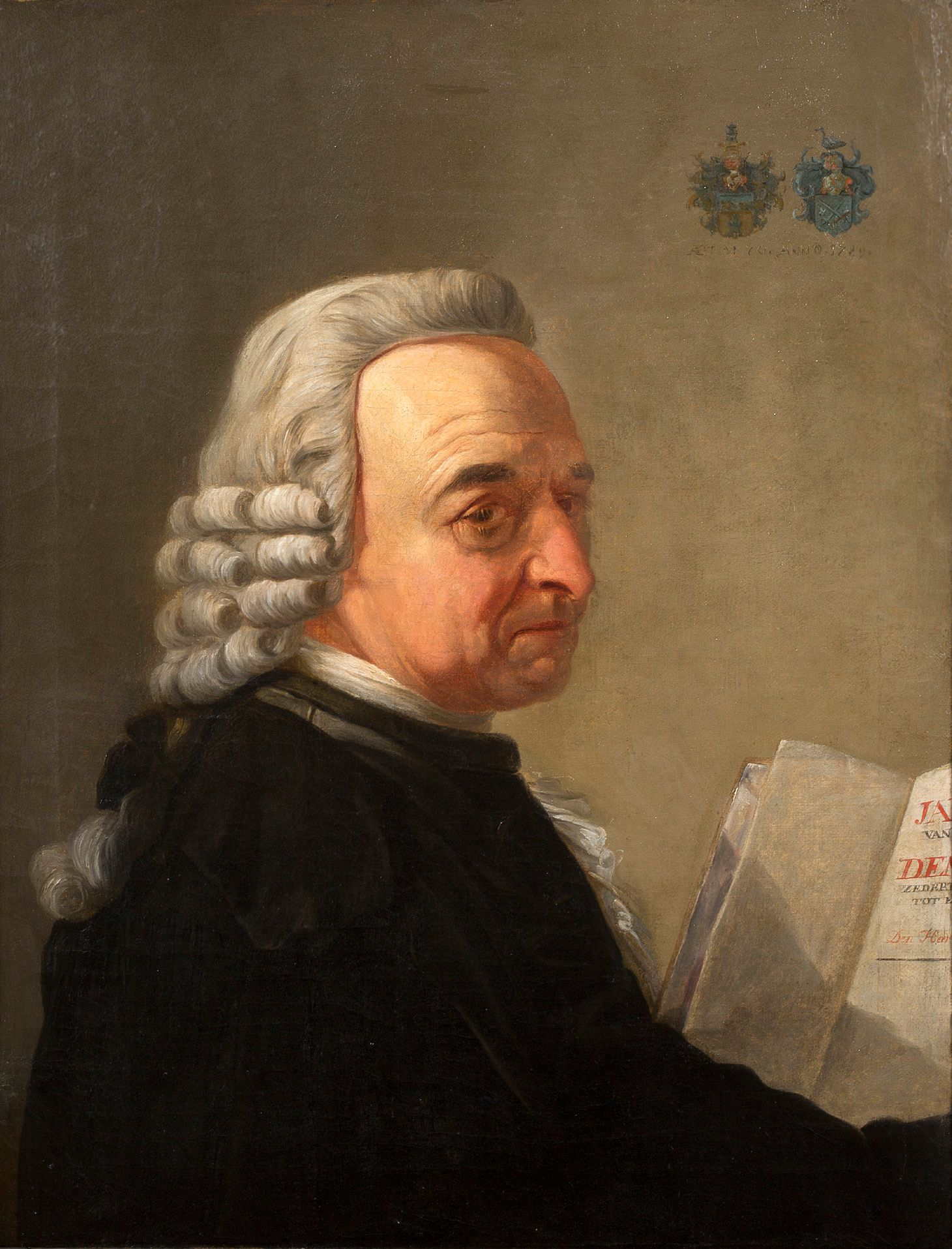
- Portrait of Patrice Beaucourt de Noortvelde, 1789, by Joseph-Benoit Suvée
- Born: Patrice Antoine Beaucourt de Noortvelde; 8 January 1720; Bruges, West Flanders, Flemish Region, Belgium
- Died: 26 November 1796 (aged 76); Bruges, West Flanders, Flemish Region, Belgium

Patrice Beaucourt de Noortvelde (8 January 1720 — 26 December 1796) was a historian, writer, and poet from the Austrian Netherlands.

== Biography ==
Patrice (or Patricius) Antoine Beaucourt de Noortvelde was born in Bruges, County of Flanders, Austrian Netherlands (now Belgium) on 8 January 1720.

He held the position of lawyer at the Council in Flanders and worked as a tax lawyer for the Tonlieu of Bruges.

He authored a historical description of the Church of Our Lady in Bruges in 1773, featuring a chronological account of all the religious figures and a compilation of ancient and modern epitaphs from this church.

== Death ==
Patrice Beaucourt died in Bruges, Département de la Lys, French First Republic (now Belgium) on 26 November 1796.

== Family ==
He had a son named Charles Jacques Joseph and a daughter named Marie Joséphine Isabelle.

== Works ==
- Description of the lordship and lands of the provost extending within and the city of Bruges, 1764
- Historical Description of the Church of Notre Dame in Bruges (French: Description historique de l église Notre Dame à Bruges), 1773
- Year books of the land of the Free (Dutch: Jaer-boeken van den lande van den Vryen), 1785
- Faithful Table of the Troubles and Revolutions in Flanders from 1500 to 1586 (French: Tableau fidèle des troubles et révolutions arrivés en Flandre depuis 1500 jusqu'à 1586)
