= Biographie Nationale de Belgique =

Belgian biographical dictionary (1866–1986)

The Biographie nationale de Belgique (French pronunciation: [bjɔɡʁafi nɑsjɔnal də bɛlʒik]; English: National Biography of Belgium) is a biographical dictionary of Belgium. It was published by the Royal Academy of Belgium in 44 volumes between 1866 and 1986. A continuation series, entitled the Nouvelle Biographie Nationale ([nuvɛl bjɔɡʁafi nɑsjɔnal], New National Biography), has been published by the Royal Academy of Science, Letters and Fine Arts of Belgium since 1988, with volume 16 appearing in 2023. Both the Biographie nationale and Nouvelle biographie nationale were digitised by the Fonds InBev-Baillet Latour and can be freely consulted on the Academy's website.

A parallel biographical dictionary has been produced in Dutch since 1964, entitled Nationaal Biografisch Woordenboek (Flemish pronunciation: [nɑ(t)ɕoːˈnaːl bijoːˈɣraːfis ˈʋoːrdə(m)ˌbuk]; National Biographical Dictionary). It places more emphasis on figures important to the history and culture of the Flemish Region and is published by the Royal Flemish Academy of Belgium for Science and the Arts (with the co-operation of the Royal Academy of Dutch language and literature and the Royal Academy of Medicine of Belgium).
